= List of JavaScript libraries =

This is a list of notable JavaScript libraries.

== Constraint programming ==
- Cassowary (software)
- CHR.js

== Document Object Model (DOM) (manipulation) oriented ==
- Google Polymer
- Dojo Toolkit
- jQuery
- MooTools
- Prototype JavaScript Framework

== Graphical–visualization (canvas, SVG, or WebGL related) ==
- AnyChart
- Apache ECharts
- Babylon.js
- Chart.js
- Cytoscape
- D3.js
- Dojo Toolkit
- FusionCharts
- Google Charts
- JointJS
- p5.js
- Plotly.js
- Processing.js
- Raphaël
- RGraph
- SWFObject
- Teechart
- Three.js
- Velocity.js
- Verge3D
- Webix

== GUI (Graphical user interface) and widget related ==
- Angular (application platform) by Google
- AngularJS by Google
- Bootstrap
- Dojo Widgets
- Ext JS by Sencha
- Foundation by ZURB
- jQuery UI
- jQWidgets
- OpenUI5 by SAP
- Polymer (library) by Google
- qooxdoo
- React.js by Meta–Facebook
- Vue.js
- Webix
- WinJS
- Svelte

=== Discontinued ===
- Glow
- Lively Kernel
- Script.aculo.us
- YUI Library

== Pure JavaScript, Ajax ==
- ASP.NET AJAX (Microsoft Ajax library)
- Google Closure Library
- MochiKit
- PDF.js
- Socket.IO
- Spry framework
- Underscore.js

== Template systems ==
- jQuery Mobile
- Mustache
- Jinja-JS
- Twig.js

== Unit testing ==
- Jasmine
- Mocha
- QUnit

== Test automation ==
- Playwright
- Cypress

== Web-application related (MVC, MVVM) ==
- Angular (application platform) by Google
- AngularJS by Google
- Backbone.js
- Echo
- Ember.js
- Enyo
- Express.js
- Ext JS
- Google Web Toolkit
- JsRender/JsViews
- Knockout
- Meteor
- Mojito
- MooTools
- Next.js
- Nuxt.js
- OpenUI5 by SAP
- Polymer (library) by Google
- Prototype JavaScript Framework
- qooxdoo
- React.js
- SproutCore
- svelte
- Vue.js

== Other ==
- Blockly
- Cannon.js
- MathJax
- Modernizr
- TensorFlow
- Brain.js

== See also ==
- Ajax framework
- Comparison of JavaScript-based web frameworks
- List of PHP software and tools
