= Decentraleyes =

Browser extension

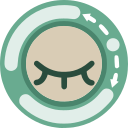
- Original author: Thomas Rientjes
- Stable release: 3.0.0 / November 20, 2024; 23 months ago
- Written in: Javascript, HTML, CSS
- License: Mozilla Public License 2.0
- Website: https://decentraleyes.org
- Repository: git.synz.io/Synzvato/decentraleyes

Decentraleyes is a free and open-source browser extension used for local content delivery network (CDN) emulation. Its primary task is to block connections to major CDNs such as Cloudflare and Google (for privacy and anti-tracking purposes) and serve popular web libraries (such as JQuery and AngularJS) locally on the user's machine. Decentraleyes is available for Microsoft Edge, Mozilla Firefox + Firefox ESR, Google Chrome, Pale Moon and Opera web browsers.

== Overview ==
Decentraleyes is bundled with 14 Javascript libraries; AngularJS, Backbone.js, Dojo, Ember.js, Ext Core, jQuery, jQuery UI, Modernizr, MooTools, Prototype (including script.aculo.us), SWFObject, Underscore.js, and Web Font Loader. It can locally redirect connections to the Google Hosted Libraries, Microsoft Ajax CDN, CDNJS (Cloudflare), jQuery CDN (MaxCDN), jsDelivr (MaxCDN), Yandex CDN, Baidu CDN, Sina Public Resources, and UpYun Libraries networks. With these bundled resources in the software package, they are served to the user locally from their machine, as opposed to from a server. The blocking of connections to these CDNs is claimed to result in faster loading times for the end user.

=== Reception ===
Lifehacker has recommended Decentraleyes as a solution to help prevent the user's data from being tracked by Google. CloudPro, a UK-based cloud computing publication, endorsed Decentraleyes as a way of blocking malicious man-in-the-middle CDN attacks.

== History ==
Decentraleyes was first released in late 2015, compatible with the Firefox browser.

Between 2016 and 2017, a spinoff extension called LocalCDN was created. It brought the functionality of Decentraleyes to Chromium based browsers, for which it was not available at the time (until later that year).

In October 2017, Decentraleyes 2.0.0 was released. The new version was rewritten from scratch to comply with the new Firefox browser add-on standards and had a more consistent user interface and better support for right-to-left languages.
