= MODX =

Open source content management system and web application framework

- Current logo

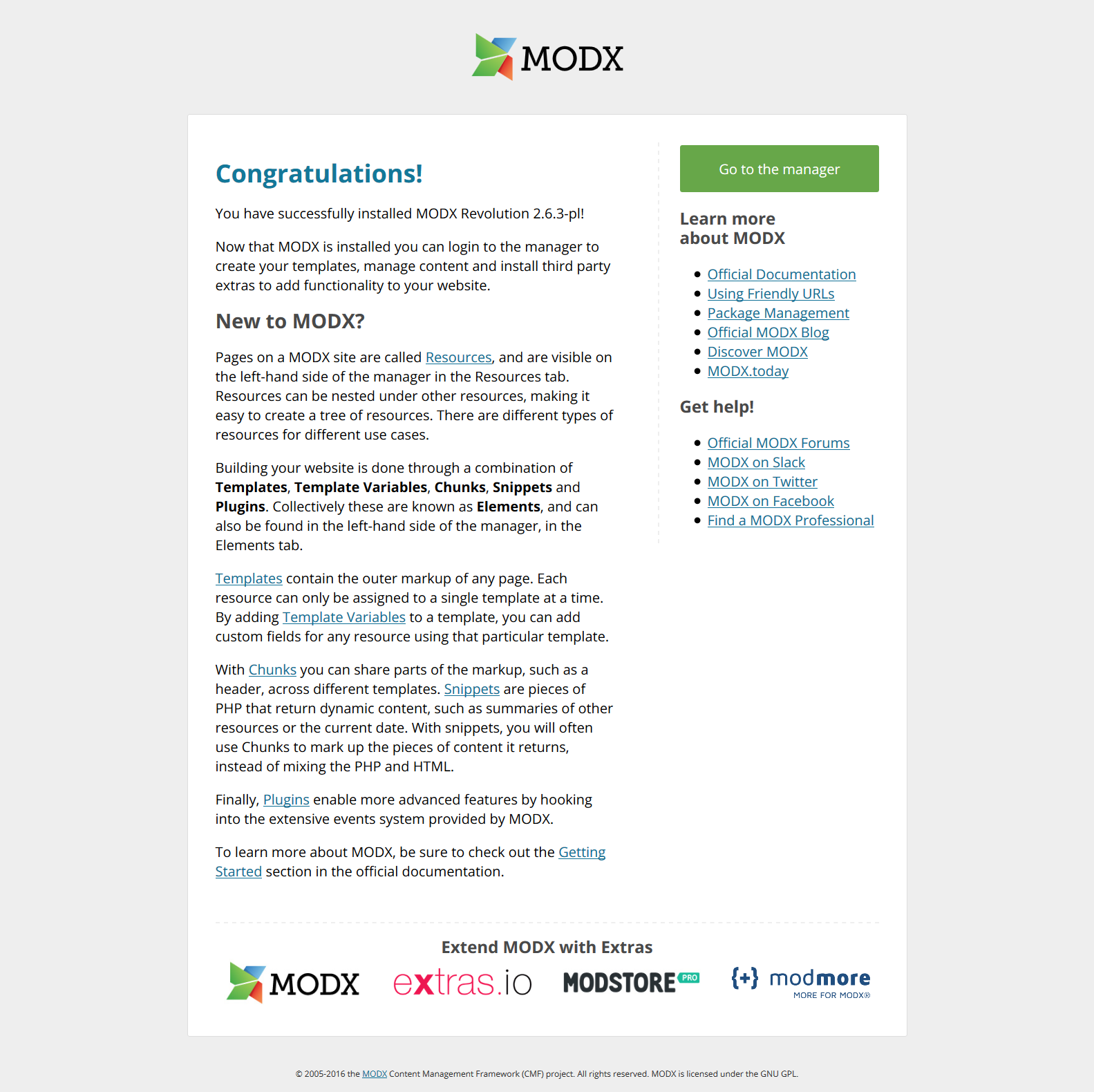
- Original authors: Raymond Irving; Ryan Thrash
- Developer: MODX LLC
- Release: 2004
- Stable release: 3.1.2 / 2025-04-02[±]
- Preview release: 3.0.0-beta2 / 2021-11-23
- Written in: PHP
- Operating system: Cross-platform
- Type: Content Management System
- License: GPL
- Website: modx.com
- Repository: github.com/modxcms/revolution

MODX (originally MODx) is an open source content management system and web application framework for publishing content on the World Wide Web and intranets. MODX is licensed under the GPL, is written in the PHP programming language, and supports MySQL, MariaDB and Percona Server as the database. It was awarded Packt Publishing's Most Promising Open Source Content Management System in 2007.

== History ==
The developers Raymond Irving and Ryan Thrash began the MODX CMS project in 2004 as a mashup of DocVars for Etomite and Raymond's web user add-on. In March 2005, all references to "MODX" were removed from the Etomite forums, coupled with a request from its founder to cease MODX support activities there. At this point, MODX became a fork of Etomite.

By May 2005, the MODX forums were online and Jason Coward joined the project leadership team. In 2007, Raymond left the project on amicable terms. The following year, Shaun McCormick joined the project leadership team.

In 2008, MODX users created a new logo and branding for the project.

In 2010, the first version of MODX Revolution, a complete rewrite of the CMS, was released. MODX LLC was founded in May 2010. May 2010 also saw the first official MODX conference, MODXpo Dallas. The event's main sponsor was Microsoft.

In July 2012 ClipperCMS, an independent fork of MODX Evolution (MODX 1) was launched.

In October 2012, MODX LLC launched MODX Cloud, a cloud-based hosting service for MODX sites.

In March 2013, MODX LLC split MODX Cloud into another company, SiphonLabs. This separation was short-lived, and MODX Cloud was re-integrated into the parent company in July 2013.

In June 2013, Mark Hamstra—a well-known developer in the MODX community—launched modmore. modmore is the first major source of premium add-ons for MODX. In November of that year the second official MODXpo was held in Cologne, Germany.

In January 2014, MODX was added to the BitNami installer library. John Peca joined the core development team, replacing Shaun McCormick who moved on after the SiphonLabs event.

In July 2014, MODX 2.3 was released to the public. The release—the biggest for several years—features a significantly updated manager interface and various minor feature improvements. In September of that year modmore hosted the first MODX Weekend in Utrecht, The Netherlands.

In August 2015, MODX 2.4 was released to the public. This version introduce package dependencies for MODX Extras, as well as numerous security, stability and performance improvements.

In November 2015 the MODXpo Conference was hosted by Kochan & Partner in Munich, Germany, with speakers from across Europe and the United States engaging in a 3-day exposition of MODX and the future of the platform.

In February 2016, MODX 2.5 was released to the public.

In November 2017, MODX 2.6 was released to the public.

In July 2018, the alpha version of MODX 3 was released.

In July 2018, a free Extra called FRED for visual drag-and-drop content editing and creation was released - for versions 2.6 and 3 of MODX.

In November 2018, MODX 2.7 was released to the public.

On March 30, 2022 MODX 3.0.0 was released.

== Current version ==
In March 2022, a major version update MODX 3.0 was released.

Current Version is: 3.2.3 (rel. 21-Jul-2026)

== Features ==
MODX allows for full segregation of content (plain HTML), appearance and behavior (standards compliant CSS and JavaScript), and logic (PHP snippets).

Additional MODX features include:

- Graphical web-based installer.
- Supports PHP 5.6 and above.
- Supports WYSIWYG rich-text editors.
- The Manager application works cross-browser and cross-platform, including Firefox, Safari, and Internet Explorer on Windows, Mac OS X (Firefox and Safari), and Linux (Firefox).
- Can be installed under IIS, Apache, lighttpd, Hiawatha, Cherokee, nginx, and Zeus web servers.
- Supports any Ajax library, including jQuery, MooTools, ExtJS, and Prototype.
- Recursive parser for nested functionality.
- Complete control of all metadata and URL structure for Search Engine Optimization (SEO) purposes.
- Object-oriented, MVC compliant core code.
- Role-based permissions for the Manager.
- Ability to customize the Manager on a per-deployment basis.
- Ability to install add-ons right from the Manager.
- E-commerce integration via Foxy Cart.

== Extensions and modules ==
Additional extensions or modules for MODX (installed to enhance the CMS or add additional features) are called "Extras". These extras are installed within the manager as "Packages", delivered by package providers. Out of the box MODX comes with one "Provider", which is MODX's own core package platform.

Additional package providers can be added by administrators, and a number of providers are found on the MODX forums.

== Translations and community ==
MODX has active, global end-user and developer communities. These communities have translated MODX into their native languages, including: Alsatian, Bulgarian, Chinese, Czech, Danish, Dutch, Finnish, French, German, Greek, Hebrew, Italian, Japanese, Norwegian, Persian, Polish, Portuguese (Brazilian and European), Russian, Serbian, Spanish, Swedish, and Turkish. Other active communities reside in India and the United Kingdom.

== Recognition, awards, and publications ==
=== Packt Publishing ===
In July 2007, MODX was awarded Packt Publishing's Most Promising Open Source Content Management System award.

=== CMS Critic ===
In 2012, MODX won CMS Critic's Best Open Source CMS (Critic's Choice) award.

In 2013, it won Best Open Source CMS (People's Choice).

=== Reviews ===
Linux.com reviewed MODX on January 14, 2008. Its author concluded that "MODX is an easy-to-use, standards-compliant, search-engine-friendly, functional, and extensible CMS…".

sitepoint.com reviewed MODX on May 13, 2016. ". MODX is not my recommendation for a non-technical person to build a website, but it’s a great choice for a developer who needs to give clients protected access to editing content. MODX is excellent, with a pretty strait learning curve, if you’re a developer and want freedom to design how you wish."

=== Publications ===
Several MODX books have been published, including:

- Bob Ray - MODX: The Official Guide
- W. Shawn Wilkerson - MODX Revolution: Building The Web Your Way
- Antano Solar John - MODX Web Development
