= Spry framework =

Open-source Ajax framework

Spry Framework
- Original author: Adobe Systems
- Final release: 1.6.1 / April 25, 2008; 18 years ago
- Written in: JavaScript
- Type: Web application framework
- License: MIT
- Website: https://github.com/adobe/Spry
- Repository: github.com/adobe/spry

The Spry Framework is an open source Ajax framework developed by Adobe Systems which is used in the construction of Rich Internet applications. Unlike other pure JavaScript frameworks such as the Dojo Toolkit and Prototype, Spry is geared towards web designers, not web developers. On August 29, 2012, Adobe announced that it would no longer continue development of Spry and handed it over to the community on GitHub.

== Components ==
The Spry framework broadly consists of

- Spry Effects - animation effects like blind, fade, grow, highlight, shake, slide and squish.
- Spry Data - data binding to HTML markup using minimal code or proprietary markup. Spry uses Google's Xpath JavaScript library to convert XML into JavaScript objects. It can handle XML, HTML and JSON data.
- Spry Widgets - framework for development of widgets, and included widgets such as the accordion.

== Versions ==
Spry is currently in beta. The current version is 1.6.1. Spry prerelease 1.5 was released on May 17, 2007

On August 29, 2012, Adobe announced that they would discontinue investing in Spry, focusing on jQuery instead.

== Usage ==
The Spry framework is directly integrated into Adobe Systems's Dreamweaver CS3.

There is further speculation as to how Adobe will utilize the Spry codebase. Possible uses are:

- Ajax development within an IDE such as Eclipse (software).
- Ajax generation from server code using ColdFusion. Ruby on Rails offers similar functionality.
- Ajax application generation from Adobe Flex code. OpenLaszlo will offer similar functionality with their "Legals" release (version 4).

== Competitors ==
Spry competes with a number of other Ajax frameworks and toolkits:

- Atlas Framework from Microsoft
- Ext JS
- Dojo Toolkit
- Echo
- Google Web Toolkit
- jQuery
- MooTools
- M and Script.aculo.us
- YUI Library

== See also ==
- Ajax framework
