= Webix =

Web application development toolkit

Webix JavaScript UI Widgets Library
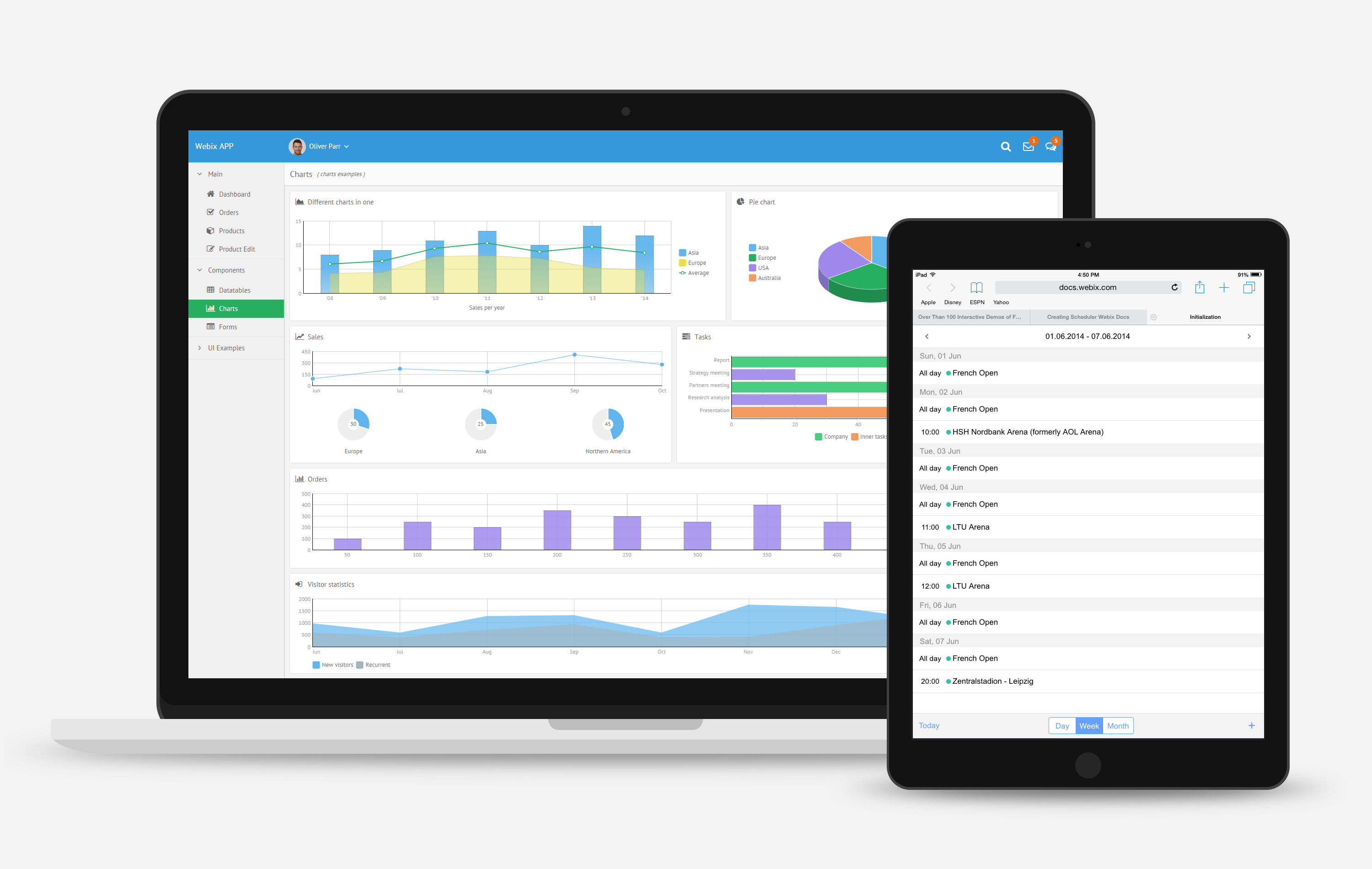
- Stable release: 11.1 / April 23, 2025; 14 months ago
- Type: JavaScript library
- License: GNU General Public License, Commercial
- Website: webix.com
- Repository: github.com/webix-hub/webix

Webix is a JavaScript/HTML5/CSS3 UI Library & framework for developing complex and dynamic cross-platform web applications.

== Features ==
Webix consists of GUI controls, widgets, complex widgets and online tools: Snippet Tool, Form Builder, and Skin Builder.

All widgets support drag and drop, offline storage and synchronization, dynamic data loading and paging. They can be initialized from JSON data, HTML markup, XML data, or JavaScript calls.

Webix integrates with client-side libraries and frameworks like React, Angular and Vue.js, and with the Meteor full-stack framework.

== Commercial status ==
There are two versions of Webix library: Webix Standard and Webix PRO.

Webix Standard is free and open-sourced under the GNU GPLv3 license, but can be used in applications distributed under the MIT, BSD and other open-source licenses via a FLOSS exception. Webix Standard includes 68 widgets and controls as well as 10 locales.

Webix PRO is available under a commercial license and includes extra functionality: 100 widgets and controls, plus 300 locales. The following features are included: additional DataTable functionality, saving and restoring application state, extra styling and customization, ability to use complex widgets: Pivot, Kanban, Spreadsheet, File Manager, and Scheduler. Complex widgets are available at extra cost.

== See also ==
- JavaScript
- Ajax (programming)
- Comparison of JavaScript frameworks
- List of JavaScript libraries
- List of widget toolkits
- JavaScript framework
- JavaScript library
