= Glow (JavaScript library) =

Open-source JavaScript library created by the BBC

- Developer(s): BBC
- Final release: 1.7.7 / 30 June 2011; 13 years ago
- Repository: github.com/glow/glow1
- Written in: JavaScript
- Operating system: Cross-platform (JavaScript)
- Type: JavaScript library
- License: Apache License
- Website: www.bbc.co.uk/glow/

Glow is an open-source JavaScript library created by the BBC. Development on Glow began in 2007, and it was publicly released under an Apache License in July 2009.

The rationale for the development of the library, as opposed to using other libraries such as jQuery or YUI, was to meet the BBC's stated targets for cross-browser compatibility (particularly Safari 1.3) that are of particular use in creating a website that uses data that corresponds to times, for example broadcast metadata.
