= Comparison of JavaScript-based web frameworks =

This is a comparison of web frameworks for front-end web development that are reliant on JavaScript code for their behavior.

== General information ==
Framework	Version compared	Download size & link	License	Source language
Angular	21.0.0; 17 Nov 2025	10.3 MB	MIT	TypeScript
AngularJS	1.8.3; 7 Apr 2022	AngularJS support has officially ended	MIT	JavaScript
Apache Royale	0.9.12; 11 Dec 2024	19 KB (zipped)	Apache	ActionScript 3, MXML, CSS
Backbone.js	1.6.1; 1 Apr 2025	190 KB	MIT	JavaScript
Dojo	1.17.3; 13 Aug 2022	7.29 MB	BSD & AFL	JavaScript
Ember.js	6.7.0; 10 Oct 2025	14.2 MB	MIT	JavaScript
Enyo	2.7.0; 1 Apr 2016	25 KB (core gzipped)	Apache 2	JavaScript
Ext JS	7.9.0; 22 Apr 2025	Variable	GPL & Commercial	JavaScript
Google Web Toolkit	2.12.2; 3 Mar 2025	109 MB gwt-2.12.2.zip	Apache	Java
Htmx	2.0.8; 25 Oct 2025	16.2 KB htmx.min.js.gz	Zero-Clause BSD	Javascript
jQuery (library)	3.7.1; 28 Aug 2023	34.7 KB	MIT	JavaScript
jQWidgets	17.0.0; 11 Aug 2023	198 MB	CC & Commercial	JavaScript
Knockout	3.5.1; Jul 2021	69.9 KB	MIT	JavaScript
MooTools	1.6.0; 14 Jan 2016	58.1 KB	MIT	JavaScript
Prototype & script. aculo.us	Prototype: 1.7.3; 22 Sep 2015 script.aculo.us: 1.9.0; 23 Dec 2010	Variable	MIT	JavaScript
qooxdoo	7.9.2; 13 Oct 2025	24.8 MB	LGPL & EPL	JavaScript
React	19.2.0; 01 Oct 2025	172 KB	MIT	JavaScript / TypeScript
SAP OpenUI5	1.141.2; 22 Oct 2025	Variable	Apache 2	JavaScript
SproutCore	1.11.2; 2 May 2016	236 KB	MIT	JavaScript
Svelte	5.42.2; 26 Oct 2025	2.64 MB	MIT	JavaScript / TypeScript
Next.js	16.0.0; 22 Oct 2025	139 MB	MIT	JavaScript / TypeScript
SolidJS	1.9.9; 24 Sep 2024	1.06 MB	MIT	JavaScript / TypeScript
Astro	2.0.0; 17 Oct 2024	2.4 MB	MIT	JavaScript / TypeScript
React Router	7.11.0; 17 Dec 2025	27.1 KB	MIT	JavaScript / TypeScript
Remix	2.17.2; 29 Oct 2025	278 KB	MIT	JavaScript / TypeScript
Qwik	1.0.0; 5 Oct 2024	54.5 MB	MIT	JavaScript / TypeScript
Fresh	2.1.2; 8 Oct 2025	10.3 KB	MIT	JavaScript / TypeScript
Preact	11.0.0; 19 Aug 2025	1.26 MB	MIT	JavaScript / TypeScript
Vue.js	3.5.42; 27 Aug 2026	3 MB	MIT	JavaScript / TypeScript
Webix	11.2.0; 25 Sep 2025	7.48 MB	GPL & Commercial	JavaScript
ZK	10.2.1; 1 Jul 2025	Variable	LGPL & GPL & ZOL	XML + Java (JavaScript optional)

== High-level framework comparison ==
JavaScript-based web application frameworks, such as React and Vue, provide extensive capabilities but come with associated trade-offs. These frameworks often extend or enhance features available through native web technologies, such as routing, component-based development, and state management. While native web standards, including Web Components, modern JavaScript APIs like Fetch and ES Modules, and browser capabilities like Shadow DOM, have advanced significantly, frameworks remain widely used for their ability to enhance developer productivity, offer structured patterns for large-scale applications, simplify handling edge cases, and provide tools for performance optimization.

Frameworks can introduce abstraction layers that may contribute to performance overhead, larger bundle sizes, and increased complexity. Modern frameworks, such as React 18 and Vue 3, address these challenges with features like concurrent rendering, tree-shaking, and selective hydration. While these advancements improve rendering efficiency and resource management, their benefits depend on the specific application and implementation context. Lightweight frameworks, such as Svelte and Preact, take different architectural approaches, with Svelte eliminating the virtual DOM entirely in favor of compiling components to efficient JavaScript code, and Preact offering a minimal, compatible alternative to React. Framework choice depends on an application’s requirements, including the team’s expertise, performance goals, and development priorities.

A newer category of web frameworks, including enhance.dev, Astro, and Fresh, leverages native web standards while minimizing abstractions and development tooling. These solutions emphasize progressive enhancement, server-side rendering, and optimizing performance. Astro renders static HTML by default while hydrating only interactive parts. Fresh focuses on server-side rendering with zero runtime overhead. Enhance.dev prioritizes progressive enhancement patterns using Web Components. While these tools reduce reliance on client-side JavaScript by shifting logic to build-time or server-side execution, they still use JavaScript where necessary for interactivity. This approach makes them particularly suitable for performance-critical and content-focused applications.

== Features ==
	Angular	AngularJS	Apache Royale	Dojo	Ember.js	Enyo	Ext JS	Google Web Toolkit	jQuery	jQWidgets	MooTools	OpenUI5	Prototype & script. aculo.us	qooxdoo	React	SproutCore	Svelte	Vue	ZK	Webix
Feature detection		Yes		Yes	Yes		Yes	No	Yes	Yes	Yes		No	Yes		Yes			No	Yes
DOM wrapped		Yes		Yes	No	Yes	Yes	Yes	Yes		No		No	Yes		No			Yes	Yes
XMLHttpRequest data retrieval		Yes	Yes	Yes		Yes	Yes	Yes	Yes	Yes	Yes	Yes	Yes	Yes		Yes				Yes
WebSocket				Yes		Yes	Yes	Yes	Yes	No	Yes	Yes	Yes	Yes		Via Plugin				Yes
Server push data retrieval				Yes			Yes	Yes	Yes	No						Via Plugin			Yes	Yes
Other data retrieval			Yes: XML, HTML, CSV, ATOM, AMF, JSON	Yes: XML, HTML, CSV, ATOM			Yes: XML, SOAP, AMF, Ext.Direct	Yes: RPC, RequestFactory	Yes: XML, HTML	Yes: XML, JSON, CSV, TSV	Yes: XML, HTML									Yes: XML, HTML, CS, JSON, JSArray, CSV
Drag and drop			Yes	Yes			Yes	With plugin	With plugins	Yes	Yes	Yes	Yes	Yes		Yes			Yes	Yes
Simple visual effects		Yes	Yes	Yes		Yes	Yes	Yes	Yes	Yes	Yes	Yes	Yes	Yes		Yes	Yes		Yes	Yes
Animation / advanced visual effects		Yes		Yes		Yes	Yes	Yes	Yes	Yes	Yes		Yes	Yes		Yes			Yes	Yes
Back button support / history management				Yes	Yes	Yes	Yes	Yes	With plugins	No	With plugin		Yes	Yes		Yes			Yes	Yes
Input form widgets & validation		Yes	Yes	Yes		Yes	Yes	Yes: Validation requires plugin	With plugins	Yes	Yes	Yes	Yes	Yes		Yes			Yes	Yes
	Angular	AngularJS	Apache Royale	Dojo	Ember.js	Enyo	ExtJS	Google Web Toolkit	jQuery	jQWidgets	MooTools	OpenUI5	Prototype & script. aculo.us	qooxdoo	React	SproutCore	Svelte	Vue	ZK	Webix
Grid			Yes	Yes			Yes	Yes	With plugins	Yes	With plugin	Yes		Yes		Yes			Yes	Yes
Hierarchical Tree			Yes	Yes		Yes	Yes	Yes	With plugins	Yes	With plugins	Yes		Yes		Yes			Yes	Yes
Rich text editor		No	Yes	Yes			Yes	Yes	With plugins	Yes	Yes			Yes		Via plugin			Yes	Yes
Autocompletion tools		No		Yes			Yes	Yes	Yes	Yes	With plugin		Yes			With plugins			Yes	Yes
HTML generation tools		No		Yes			Yes	Yes	Yes	Yes	Yes		Yes	Yes		Yes			Yes	Yes
Widgets themeable / skinnable			Yes	Yes		Yes	Yes	Yes	Yes		Yes	Yes	Yes			Yes			Yes	Yes
GUI resizable panels and modal dialogs			Yes	Yes		Yes	Yes	Yes	With plugins	Yes	Yes			Yes		Yes			Yes	Yes
GUI page layout				Yes			Yes	Yes	With plugin	Yes	Yes			Yes		Yes			Yes	Yes
Canvas support			Yes	Yes		Yes	Yes	Yes	With plugin	Yes	Yes			Yes		Yes			Yes	Yes
Mobile/tablet support (touch events)		Yes	Yes	Yes	Yes	Yes	Yes	With plugin	With plugin	Yes	With plugin	Yes		Yes		Yes			Yes	Yes
Accessibility / graceful degradation		Yes		Yes	No	Yes	Yes	Yes	Yes	Yes	Yes			No		Degradation: No; Accessibility: Yes			Yes	Yes
ARIA compliant				Yes			Yes		Yes	Yes		Yes		No		Yes	Yes		Yes	Yes
Developer tools, Visual design				Yes		in progress	Yes	Yes	Yes	Yes	Yes			Yes		No			Yes	Yes
Offline storage			Yes	No		Yes	Yes	Via Google Gears	With plugin	Yes				Yes		Yes			Yes	Yes
Cross-browser 2d Vector Graphics				Yes			Yes		With plugin	Yes	Yes					No			Yes	Yes (via Raphael)
Charting & Dashboard			Yes	Yes			Yes		With plugin	Yes						No			Yes	Yes
RTL Support in UI Components			Yes	Yes			Yes		Depends on the plugin used	Yes		Yes				Yes				No
	Angular	AngularJS	Apache Royale	Dojo	Ember.js	Enyo	ExtJS	Google Web Toolkit	jQuery	jQWidgets	MooTools	OpenUI5	Prototype & script. aculo.us	qooxdoo	React	SproutCore	Svelte	Vue	ZK	Webix

== Browser support ==
Framework	Internet Explorer	Mozilla Firefox	Safari	Opera	Chrome	Edge
Angular		Latest and extended support release	2 most recent major versions		Latest and previous stable version	2 most recent major versions
AngularJS (1.3)	8+ (9+)	4+	5+	11+	30+	
Apache Royale	9 (Edge --> 10)	21	6	15	23	
Dojo	6+	3+	4	10.50+	3	
Ember.js	6+	3+	4+	10.6+	14+	
Enyo	8+	>4	>5		>10	
Ext JS	8+	45+	11+	43+	64+	
Google Web Toolkit	8+	1+	5+	9+	1+	
jQuery (3.x)	6+ (9+)	2+	3+	9+	1+	
jQWidgets	7+	2+	3+	9+	1+	
MooTools	6+	2+	3+	9+	1+	
Prototype & script. aculo.us	6+	1.5+	2.0.4+	9.25+	1+ (starting with 1.6.1RC3)	
qooxdoo	6+	2+	3+	9+	2+	
React	9+					
SAP OpenUI5	11+	Latest Stable and ESR	Last 2		Latest Version	
SproutCore	6+	3+	4+	9+	1+	
Svelte		21+	6+	15+	23+	12+
Vue	10+	21+	6+	15+	23+	12+
ZK	6+	2.0+	3+	9+	2+	
Webix	11+	93+	5+	95+	95+	95+
