= Cross compatibility =

Cross compatibility may refer to:

- Cross-browser compatibility, ability of website or application to function across different browsers
- Software compatibility, compatibility between different systems
- Cross-platform, software implemented on multiple computing platforms.
