= JQWidgets =

Software framework

- A screenshot of a dashboard web application created using jQWidgets controls.
- Developer: jQWidgets Ltd
- Initial release: November 16, 2011; 14 years ago
- Stable release: 25.0.0 / 6 January 2026
- Written in: JavaScript
- Type: Plug-in
- License: Creative Commons Attribution-NonCommercial 3.0 License and Commercial License
- Website: www.jqwidgets.com

jQWidgets is a software framework with widgets (graphical control elements), themes, input validation, drag & drop plug-in, data adapters, built-in WAI-ARIA accessibility, internationalization and MVVM support. It is built on the open standards and technologies HTML5, CSS, JavaScript and jQuery. This library is used for developing responsive web and mobile applications. Some developers consider jQWidgets one of the top alternatives to the open-source jQuery UI.

Some notable users of jQWidgets include Green Card Program USA, the French citizen portal Vie-publique.fr, the University of Iowa and the University of Maryland. The framework is also used in NSB/AppStudio.

jQWidgets has been integrated with a variety of other frameworks and web technologies, such as Vue.js, React, Angular 2+, AngularJS, TypeScript, Apache Cordova, WordPress, Joomla, Bootstrap and Knockout.

== Features ==
jQWidgets features more than 60 widgets and plug-ins. Some of the most used of them are:

- jqxGrid - a grid view widget that displays tabular data.
- jqxChart - a chart widget.
- jqxTree - a tree view widget that displays a hierarchical collection of items.
- jqxTreeGrid - a widget which represents data in a tree-like structure.
- jqxDropDownList - a drop-down list widget.
- jqxDataTable - a widget built as an alternative to HTML Tables.
- jqxWindow - a dialog box widget.
- jqxComboBox - a combo box control.
- jqxDateTimeInput - a date picker widget that enables the user to select a date or time using a popup calendar display or by keyboard input into the text field.
- jqxScheduler - a personal information manager control akin to Google Calendar and Apple's Calendar. It supports the iCalendar file format.
- jqxDockingLayout - a widget that can be used for creating IDE-like layouts.

== Smart HTML Elements ==
In 2018, JQWidgets Ltd released Smart HTML Elements, a framework with widgets which are represented by Custom HTML elements (a functionality part of Web Components). The framework is built with HTML5, CSS, and JavaScript and is not dependent on any third-party software. It supports modern web browsers and mobile devices.

Smart HTML Elements also provides arbitrary-precision arithmetic and mathematical functions and DateTime precision up to a yoctosecond (10^{−24} second).

Smart HTML Elements has been featured on the website webcomponents.org, which showcases reusable web UI components.

Smart HTML Elements also includes UI components for Angular, React, Vue and Blazor. As of January 2021, Admin & Dashboard Templates are available.
