= Mojito (disambiguation) =

A mojito is a Cuban rum-based cocktail.

Mojito may also refer to:

== Songs ==
- "Mojito" (Thalía song), a 2021 song by Thalía
- ”Mojito“ (Jay Chou song), a 2020 song by Jay Chou
- "Mojito", a 2013 song by Smilers
- "Mojito", a 2017 song by Red Velvet from The Red Summer

== Others ==
- Mojito (framework), a model-view-controller (MVC) web application framework
- Mojito, New Jersey, a temporary name for the community of Richland, New Jersey
- Mojito, a variant of mojo sauce
- Mojito, a Kademlia-based DHT to find sources on the Gnutella network
- Aprilia Mojito, a scooter model
