= OpenUI5 =

Open source toolkit by SAP for development of enterprise-ready web applications

- Developer(s): SAP SE and community
- Initial release: 11 December 2013; 11 years ago
- Stable release: 1.108.0 (October 31, 2022; 2 years ago) [±]
- Repository: OpenUI5 Repository
- Written in: JavaScript and Less (stylesheet language)
- Operating system: Cross-platform
- Predecessor: Dynpro and Web Dynpro
- Type: JavaScript framework or web framework
- License: Apache 2.0 License
- Website: OpenUI5.org

OpenUI5 is a JavaScript application framework designed to build cross-platform, responsive, enterprise-ready applications. It is an open-source project maintained by SAP SE available under the Apache 2.0 license and open to contributions. OpenUI5's core is based on JavaScript, jQuery, and LESS. The library's feature set includes model–view–controller patterns, data binding, its own UI-element library, and internationalisation support.

== History ==
The team that started the project in 2009, that eventually lead to OpenUI5 was tasked with creating a new user interface (UI) for SAP applications. Objectives included a framework that was flexible, extensible, modern, and would provide a consistent look and feel across SAP applications. In addition to this, at the time SAP's main UI framework was tightly coupled to its backend technology, becoming a bottleneck to UI improvements.

The library was open sourced in December 2013, after being used in production at SAP for several years. In October 2014, the team started accepting contributions via GitHub.

== Commercial status ==
All OpenUI5 components are completely free, and there are no paid "premium" or "commercial" widgets:

OpenUI5 is best described as a one-stop-shop toolkit. It has everything you need to build web applications, while leaving enough flexibility to extend. And by the way, it's the only one that gives you full functionality for free. While other popular toolkits come as a free trial with paid versions for full functionality, OpenUI5 comes as a complete product by itself – no upsells, no paid premium.

— OpenUI5 Frequently Asked Questions

== Main features ==
- 180 UI controls, grouped in cross-device (running on phones, tablets and desktops) — menu, carousel, panel, toolbar, icon tab bar, layout, responsive grid, splitter, list, table, dialog, message box, message toast, responsive popover, calendar, combo box, date range selection, file uploader, rating indicator, segmented button, slider, tags display, color picker, tree, table, tree table, etc.
- WYSIWYG theme designer (not open sourced)
- MVC architecture
- Different view formats (XML, HTML, JavaScript or JSON)
- Data binding with OData, JSON or XML models
- I18n, including right-to-left language support
- Consistent UX patterns across all frontend features
