= Brain.js =

JavaScript neural networking library

- Developer(s): Open-source contributors
- Initial release: May 10, 2010; 14 years ago
- Repository: Brain.js Repository
- Written in: JavaScript, TypeScript
- Platform: Node.js, Web browser
- Type: Neural Networking
- License: MIT License
- Website: brain.js.org

Brain.js is a JavaScript library used for neural networking, which is released as free and open-source software under the MIT License. It can be used in both the browser and Node.js backends.

Brain.js is most commonly used as a simple introduction to neural networking, as it hides complex mathematics and has a familiar modern JavaScript syntax. It is maintained by members of the Brain.js organization and open-source contributors.

== Examples ==
Creating a feedforward neural network with backpropagation:

const net = new brain.NeuralNetwork();

net.train([
  { input: [0, 0], output: [0] },
  { input: [0, 1], output: [1] },
  { input: [1, 0], output: [1] },
  { input: [1, 1], output: [0] },
]);

console.log(net.run([1, 0]));

Creating a recurrent neural network:

const net = new brain.recurrent.RNN();

net.train([
  { input: [0, 0], output: [0] },
  { input: [0, 1], output: [1] },
  { input: [1, 0], output: [1] },
  { input: [1, 1], output: [0] },
]);

let output = net.run([0, 0]); // [0]
output = net.run([0, 1]); // [1]
output = net.run([1, 0]); // [1]
output = net.run([1, 1]); // [0]

Train the neural network on RGB color contrast:

const net = new brain.NeuralNetwork();

net.train([{
    input: {
      r: 0.03,
      g: 0.7,
      b: 0.5
    },
    output: {
      black: 1
    }
  },
  {
    input: {
      r: 0.16,
      g: 0.09,
      b: 0.2
    },
    output: {
      white: 1
    }
  },
  {
    input: {
      r: 0.5,
      g: 0.5,
      b: 1.0
    },
    output: {
      white: 1
    }
  }
]);

const output = net.run({
  r: 1,
  g: 0.4,
  b: 0
}); // { white: 0.99, black: 0.002 }

console.log(output)
