= YUI Rich Text Editor =

Text editor

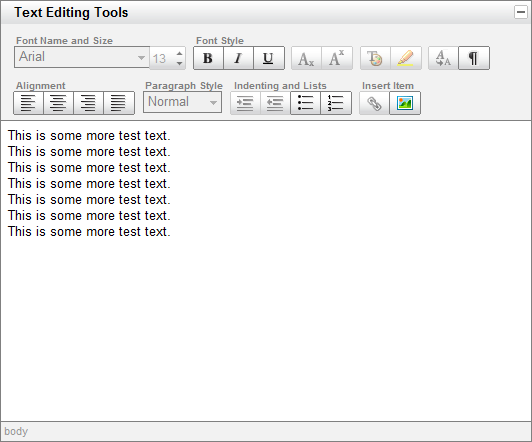
- A basic YUI rich text editor
- Developer(s): Yahoo!
- Written in: JavaScript
- Operating system: Cross-platform
- License: BSD License
- Website: yuilibrary.com/yui/docs/editor/

YUI Rich Text Editor is a project developed by Yahoo! as a part of the YUI Library for an online rich-text editor that replaces a standard HTML textarea. It allows for drag and drop inclusion and sizing of images, text coloring, realignment, fonts, italic and bold text. The YUI rich text editor uses a plug-in architecture and it is skinnable along with the rest of the YUI.

== Components ==
The YUI Rich Text Editor (RTE) contains the following components: Editor, SimpleEditor, ToolbarButton, and ToolbarButtonAdvanced. Some differences in the SimpleEditor and the Editor control are that the SimpleEditor uses JavaScript prompts and select elements rather than YUI defined elements.

== History ==
This component was designed and implemented by the Yahoo! developer Dav Glass in order to add a rich text editor component to the YUI.
