= MooTools =

Software

- Developer: The MooTools Dev Team
- Release: September 8, 2006; 19 years ago
- Stable release: 1.6.0 / January 14, 2016; 10 years ago
- Written in: JavaScript
- Type: Ajax framework / JavaScript Framework
- License: MIT License
- Website: mootools.net
- Repository: https://github.com/mootools/mootools-core

MooTools (My Object-Oriented Tools) is a lightweight, object-oriented JavaScript framework. It is released under the free, open-source MIT License.

== Overview ==
MooTools provides the user with a number of options beyond native JavaScript. These include:

- An extensible and modular framework allowing developers to choose their own customized combination of components.
- MooTools follows object-oriented practices and the DRY principle.
- An advanced effects component, with optimized transitions such as easing equations used by many Flash developers.
- Enhancements to the DOM, enabling developers to easily add, modify, select, and delete DOM elements. Storing and retrieving information with Element storage is also supported.

The framework includes built-in functions for manipulation of CSS, DOM elements, native JavaScript objects, Ajax requests, DOM effects, and more. MooTools also provides a detailed, coherent application programming interface (API), as well as a custom downloads module allowing developers to download only the modules and dependencies they need for a particular app.

== History ==
Valerio Proietti first authored the framework and released it in September 2006 taking as his inspiration Prototype and Dean Edward's base2. MooTools originated from Moo.fx, a popular JavaScript effects library released in October 2005 by Valerio Proietti as an add-on to the Prototype Javascript Framework. It can be used as a lighter alternative to script.aculo.us or other, bigger libraries. It provides simple, basic effects, and guarantees a small library size.

Whereas Prototype extended—prototyped—many of JavaScript's native String, Array, and Function objects with additional methods, Proietti desired a framework that (at the time) further extended the native Element object as well to offer greater control of the Document Object Model (DOM).

== Components ==
MooTools includes a number of components, but not all need to be loaded for each application. Some of the component categories are:

- Core: A collection of utility functions that all the other components require.
- More: An official collection of add-ons that extend the Core and provide enhanced functionality.
- Class: The base library for Class object instantiation.
- Natives: A collection of JavaScript Native Object enhancements. The Natives add functionality, compatibility, and new methods that simplify coding.
- Element: Contains a large number of enhancements and compatibility standardization to the HTML Element object.
- Fx: An advanced effects-API to animate page elements.
- Request: Includes XHR interface, Cookie, JSON, and HTML retrieval-specific tools for developers to exploit.
- Window: Provides a cross-browser interface to client-specific information, such as the dimensions of the window.

== Browser compatibility ==
MooTools is compatible and tested with:

- Safari 3+
- Internet Explorer 6+
- Mozilla Firefox 2+
- Opera 9+
- Chrome 4+

== Emphasis on modularity and reusability ==
Every JavaScript framework has its philosophy, and MooTools is interested in taking full advantage of the flexibility and power of JavaScript in a way that emphasizes greater modularity and code reuse. MooTools accomplishes these goals intuitively to a developer coming from a class-based inheritance language like Java with the MooTools Class object.

Class is an object of key/value pairs containing either properties or methods (functions). Class is effortlessly mixed and extended with other Class instantiations allowing for the most excellent focus of MooTools: Code reuse achieved through maximizing the power of JavaScript's prototypical inheritance but in a Class object syntax more familiar to classical inheritance models.

== Object-oriented programming ==
MooTools contains a robust Class creation and inheritance system that resembles most classically based Object-oriented programming languages. For example, the following is MooTools' equivalent of the examples in Wikipedia's polymorphism page:

var Animal = new Class({
    initialize: function (name) {
        this.name = name;
    }
});

var Cat = new Class({
    Extends: Animal,
    talk: function () {
        return 'Meow!';
    }
});

var Dog = new Class({
    Extends: Animal,
    talk: function () {
        return 'Arf! Arf!';
    }
});

var animals = {
    a: new Cat('Missy'),
    b: new Cat('Mr. Bojangles'),
    c: new Dog('Lassie')
};

Object.each(animals, function (animal) {
    alert(animal.name + ': ' + animal.talk());
});
 
// alerts the following:
//
// Missy: Meow!
// Mr. Bojangles: Meow!
// Lassie: Arf! Arf!

== See also ==
- Ajax framework
- Rich Internet application
- Web 2.0
- Comparison of JavaScript frameworks
- XMLHttpRequest
- JavaScript framework
- JavaScript library
