= JsRender/JsViews =

Open-source JavaScript library for writing single-page web applications

JsRender/JsViews is an open-source JavaScript library for writing single-page web applications using templates and the model–view–viewmodel (MVVM) design pattern.

There are three libraries in two source files:

- JsRender is the template library
- JsViews is the MVVM library which provides two-way data binding for the templates
  - JsObservable is integrated with JsViews and facilitates observable data manipulations that are immediately reflected in the data-bound templates.

The library evolved out of the discontinued jQuery Templates. It can also be used in server-side JavaScript development using e.g. node.js, Python's Django framework or Ruby on Rails. JsRender/JsViews is hosted on GitHub and version 1.0 was released in November 2018.

The library is developed and maintained by Microsoft employee Boris Moore and is used in projects such as Outlook.com and Windows Azure.
