= Raphaël (JavaScript library) =

Cross-browser vector graphics JavaScript library

- Developer: Dmitry Baranovskiy
- Release: August 8, 2008; 18 years ago
- Stable release: 2.3.0 / August 14, 2019; 6 years ago
- Written in: JavaScript
- License: MIT License
- Website: dmitrybaranovskiy.github.io/raphael/
- Repository: github.com/DmitryBaranovskiy/raphael

Raphaël, named for Italian painter Raffaello Sanzio da Urbino, is a cross-browser JavaScript library that draws vector graphics for web sites. It will use SVG for most browsers, but will use VML for older versions of Internet Explorer. Raphaël currently supports Chrome 5.0+ Firefox 3.0+, Safari 3.0+, Opera 9.5+ and Internet Explorer 6.0+.

== Use ==
Raphaël is used by first creating an instance of the Raphaël object, which manages the creation of the canvas. The following examples create a canvas that is 320 pixels wide and 200 pixels high:

// top left of canvas at the viewport's 10,50 coordinate
var r = Raphael(10, 50, 320, 200);

// top left of canvas at the  top left corner of the #example element (in elements where dir="ltr")
var r = Raphael(document.getElementById("example"), 320, 200);

// same as above
var r = Raphael("example", 320, 200);

Once the Raphaël object has been instantiated, its various drawing, resizing and animation methods may be called to build up a vector graphic. This library includes support of Cùfon fonts, a format that turns a given font into a set of vector paths. It is extensible through plugins.

== Usage ==
The widget is used on the Washington Post and the Times Online websites.

Raphaël is also used by iCloud.com, and by Mass Relevance in the White House.

== See also ==
- D3.js
