= JQuery UI =

JavaScript library

- Developers: Paul Bakaus; Scott González; Jörn Zaefferer; Felix Nagel; Mike Sherov; Rafael Xavier de Souza
- Stable release: 1.14.1 / 30 October 2024; 18 months ago
- Written in: JavaScript
- Type: Plug-in
- License: MIT License
- Website: jqueryui.com
- Repository: github.com/jquery/jquery-ui

jQuery UI is a collection of GUI widgets, animated visual effects, and themes implemented with jQuery (a JavaScript library), Cascading Style Sheets, and HTML.

Both jQuery and jQuery UI are free and open-source software distributed by the jQuery Foundation under the MIT License; jQuery UI was first published in September 2007.

As of October 7, 2021 jQuery UI is in maintenance mode, with no new features being planned.

== Features ==
Interactions such as draggable/droppable and sortable are supported. jQuery UI comes with fully themeable widgets using a consolidated, coordinated theme mechanism, such as Autocomplete, Datepicker, ProgressBar, Sliders, and more. Effects include color animations and class toggling.

== Example ==
// Make the element with id "draggable" draggable
$(function () {
	$("#draggable").draggable();
});

<div id="draggable">
	<p>Drag me around</p>
</div>

This makes the div with the ID "draggable" draggable by the user's mouse.

== See also ==
- JavaScript framework
- JavaScript library
