= Web framework =

Software framework to support the development of websites

A web framework (WF), web application framework (WAF), or web development framework is a software framework that is designed to support the development of web applications including web services, web resources, and web APIs. Web frameworks provide a standard way to build and deploy web applications on the World Wide Web. Web frameworks aim to automate the overhead associated with common activities performed in web development. For example, many web frameworks provide libraries for database access, templating frameworks, and session management, and they often promote code reuse. Although they often target development of dynamic web sites, they are also applicable to static websites.

== History ==
As the design of the World Wide Web was not inherently dynamic, early hypertext consisted of hand-coded HTML text files that were published on web servers. Any modifications to published pages needed to be performed by the pages' author. In 1993, the Common Gateway Interface (CGI) standard was introduced for interfacing external applications with web servers, to provide a dynamic web page that reflected user inputs.

Original implementations of the CGI interface typically had adverse effects on the server load however, because each request started a separate process. More recent implementations utilize persistent processes amongst other techniques to reduce the footprint in the server's resources and offer a general performance boost.

In 1995, fully integrated server/language development environments first emerged and new web-specific languages were introduced, such as ColdFusion, PHP, and Active Server Pages.

Although the vast majority of languages for creating dynamic web pages have libraries to help with common tasks, web applications often require specific libraries for particular tasks, such as creating HTML (for example, Jakarta Faces).

In the late 1990s, mature, "full stack" frameworks began to appear, that often gathered multiple libraries useful for web development into a single cohesive software stack for web developers to use.

== Types of framework architectures ==
Most web frameworks are based on the model–view–controller (MVC) pattern.

=== Model–view–controller (MVC) ===
Many frameworks follow the MVC architectural pattern to separate the data model into business rules (the "controller") and the user interface (the "view"). This is generally considered a good practice as it modularizes code, promotes code reuse, and allows multiple interfaces to be applied. In web applications, this permits different views to be presented, for example serving different web pages for mobile vs. desktop browsers, or providing machine-readable web service interfaces.

==== Push-based vs. pull-based ====
Most MVC frameworks follow a push-based architecture also called "action-based". These frameworks use actions that do the required processing, and then "push" the data to the view layer to render the results. An alternative to this is pull-based architecture, sometimes also called "component-based". These frameworks start with the view layer, which can then "pull" results from multiple controllers as needed. In this architecture, multiple controllers can be involved with a single view.

=== Three-tier organization ===
In three-tier organization, applications are structured around three physical tiers: client, application, and database. The database is normally an RDBMS. The application contains the business logic, running on a server and communicates with the client using HTTP. The client on web applications is a web browser that runs HTML generated by the application layer. The term should not be confused with MVC, where, unlike in three-tier architecture, it is considered a good practice to keep business logic away from the controller, the "middle layer".

== Framework applications ==
Frameworks are built to support the construction of internet applications based on a single programming language, ranging in focus from general purpose tools such as Zend Framework and Ruby on Rails, which augment the capabilities of a specific language, to native-language programmable packages built around a specific user application, such as content management systems (CMS), some mobile development tools and some portal tools.

=== General-purpose website frameworks ===
Web frameworks must function according to the architectural rules of browsers and protocols such as HTTP, which is stateless. Webpages are served up by a server and can then be modified by the browser using JavaScript. Either approach has its advantages and disadvantages.

Server-side page changes typically require that the page be refreshed, but allow any language to be used and more computing power to be utilized. Client-side changes allow the page to be updated in small chunks which feels like a desktop application, but are limited to JavaScript and run in the user's browser, which may have limited computing power. Some mix of the two is typically used. Applications which make heavy use of JavaScript and only refresh parts of the page, are called single-page applications and typically make use of a client-side JavaScript web framework to organize the code.

==== Server-side ====
- Apache Wicket
- ASP.NET Core
- CakePHP
- Catalyst
- CodeIgniter
- Django
- Express.js
- Flask
- FastAPI
- Grails
- Laravel
- Mojolicious
- Phoenix
- Ruby on Rails
- Sails.js
- Seaside (software)
- Symfony
- Spring MVC
- Wt (web toolkit)
- Yii
- Zend Framework

==== Client-side ====
Examples include Backbone.js, AngularJS, Angular, Ember.js, React, jQuery UI, Svelte, and Vue.js.

=== Capabilities and trade-offs in modern frameworks ===
JavaScript-based web application frameworks, such as React and Vue, provide extensive capabilities but come with associated trade-offs. These frameworks often extend or enhance features available through native web technologies, such as routing, component-based development, and state management. While native web standards, including Web Components, modern JavaScript APIs like Fetch and ES Modules, and browser capabilities like Shadow DOM, have advanced significantly, frameworks remain widely used for their ability to enhance developer productivity, offer structured patterns for large-scale applications, simplify handling edge cases, and provide tools for performance optimization.

Frameworks can introduce abstraction layers that may contribute to performance overhead, larger bundle sizes, and increased complexity. Modern frameworks, such as React 18 and Vue 3, address these challenges with features like concurrent rendering, tree-shaking, and selective hydration. While these advancements improve rendering efficiency and resource management, their benefits depend on the specific application and implementation context. Lightweight frameworks, such as Svelte and Preact, take different architectural approaches, with Svelte eliminating the virtual DOM entirely in favor of compiling components to efficient JavaScript code, and Preact offering a minimal, compatible alternative to React. Framework choice depends on an application’s requirements, including the team’s expertise, performance goals, and development priorities.

A newer category of web frameworks, including enhance.dev, Astro, and Fresh, leverages native web standards while minimizing abstractions and development tooling. These solutions emphasize progressive enhancement, server-side rendering, and optimizing performance. Astro renders static HTML by default while hydrating only interactive parts. Fresh focuses on server-side rendering with zero runtime overhead. Enhance.dev prioritizes progressive enhancement patterns using Web Components. While these tools reduce reliance on client-side JavaScript by shifting logic to build-time or server-side execution, they still use JavaScript where necessary for interactivity. This approach makes them particularly suitable for performance-critical and content-focused applications.

== Features ==
Frameworks typically set the control flow of a program and allow the user of the framework to "hook into" that flow by exposing various events. This "inversion of control" design pattern is considered to be a defining principle of a framework, and benefits the code by enforcing a common flow for a team which everyone can customize in similar ways. For example, some popular microframeworks, such as Ruby's Sinatra (which inspired Express.js), allow for "middleware" hooks prior to and after HTTP requests. These middleware functions can be anything, and allow the user to define logging, authentication and session management, and redirecting.

=== Caching ===
Web caching is the caching of web documents in order to reduce bandwidth usage, server load, and perceived "lag". A web cache stores copies of documents passing through it; subsequent requests may be satisfied from the cache if certain conditions are met. Some application frameworks provide mechanisms for caching documents and bypassing various stages of the page's preparation, such as database access or template interpretation.

=== Security ===
Some web frameworks come with authentication and authorization frameworks, that enable the web server to identify the users of the application, and restrict access to functions based on some defined criteria. Drupal is one example that provides role-based access to pages, and provides a web-based interface for creating users and assigning them roles.

=== Database access, mapping and configuration ===
Many web frameworks create a unified API to a database backend, enabling web applications to work with a variety of databases with no code changes, and allowing programmers to work with higher-level concepts. Additionally, some object-oriented frameworks contain mapping tools to provide object–relational mapping, which maps objects to tuples.

Some frameworks minimize web application configuration through the use of introspection and/or following well-known conventions. For example, many Java frameworks use Hibernate as a persistence layer, which can generate a database schema at runtime capable of persisting the necessary information. This allows the application designer to design business objects without needing to explicitly define a database schema. Frameworks such as Ruby on Rails can also work in reverse, that is, define properties of model objects at runtime based on a database schema.

Other features web frameworks may provide include transactional support and database migration tools.

=== URL mapping ===
A framework's URL mapping or routing facility is the mechanism by which the framework interprets URLs. Some frameworks, such as Drupal and Django, match the provided URL against pre-determined patterns using regular expressions, while some others use rewriting techniques to translate the provided URL into one that the underlying engine will recognize. Another technique is that of graph traversal such as used by Zope, where a URL is decomposed in steps that traverse an object graph (of models and views).

A URL mapping system that uses pattern matching or rewriting to route and handle requests allows for shorter more "friendly URLs" to be used, increasing the simplicity of the site and allowing for better indexing by search engines. For example, a URL that ends with "/page.cgi?cat=science&topic=physics" could be changed to simply "/page/science/physics". This makes the URL easier for people to remember, read and write, and provides search engines with better information about the structural layout of the site. A graph traversal approach also tends to result in the creation of friendly URLs. A shorter URL such as "/page/science" tends to exist by default as that is simply a shorter form of the longer traversal to "/page/science/physics".

=== AJAX ===
Ajax, shorthand for "Asynchronous JavaScript and XML", is a web development technique for creating web applications. The intent is to make web pages feel more responsive by exchanging small amounts of data with the server behind the scenes, so that the entire web page does not have to be reloaded each time the user requests a change. This is intended to increase a web page's interactivity, speed, maintainability, and usability.

Due to the complexity of Ajax programming in JavaScript, there are numerous Ajax frameworks that exclusively deal with Ajax support. Some Ajax frameworks are even embedded as a part of larger frameworks. For example, the jQuery JavaScript library is included in Ruby on Rails.

With the increased interest in developing "Web 2.0" rich web applications, the complexity of programming directly in Ajax and JavaScript has become so apparent that compiler technology has stepped in, to allow developers to code in high-level languages such as Java, Python and Ruby. The first of these compilers was Morfik followed by Google Web Toolkit, with ports to Python and Ruby in the form of Pyjs and RubyJS following some time after. These compilers and their associated widget set libraries make the development of rich media Ajax applications much more akin to that of developing desktop applications.

=== Web services ===
Some frameworks provide tools for creating and providing web services. These utilities may offer similar tools as the rest of the web application.

=== Web resources ===
A number of newer Web 2.0 RESTful frameworks are now providing resource-oriented architecture (ROA) infrastructure for building collections of resources in a sort of Semantic Web ontology, based on concepts from Resource Description Framework (RDF).

== See also ==
- Application framework – Framework in computer software
- Application security – Measures taken to improve the security of an application
- Application server – Server that hosts applications
- Comparison of JavaScript-based web frameworks (client-side, for frontend)
- Comparison of server-side web frameworks (for backend)
- Convention over configuration – Software design paradigm
- CSS framework (for frontend)
- Don't repeat yourself (DRY) – Principle of software development
- List of web service frameworks
- Rich web application (obsolete)
  - List of rich web application frameworks
- Solution stack – Set of software subsystems or components needed to create a complete platform
