= Index of JavaScript-related articles =

This is a list of articles related to the JavaScript programming language.

== A ==
- A-Frame (virtual reality framework)
- Ace (editor)
- ActionScript
- Adaptive web design
- Ajax (programming)
- Ajax4jsf
- Angular (web framework)
- AngularJS
- AnyChart
- Appcelerator
- Asm.js
- ASP.NET AJAX
- Asynchronous module definition
- Atom (text editor)
- AtScript

== B ==
- Backbone.js
- Bindows
- BioCompute Object
- Blend4Web
- Blockly
- Boa (JavaScript engine)
- BONDI (OMTP)
- Bookmarklet
- Bootstrap (front-end framework)
- Brendan Eich
- Browserify
- BSON

== C ==
- Cable Haunt
- Chakra (JavaScript engine)
- Chart.js
- Citadel/UX
- CKEditor
- CodeMirror
- CoffeeScript
- Comet (programming)
- CommonJS
- Comparison of JavaScript charting libraries
- Comparison of JavaScript frameworks
- Comparison of JavaScript-based web frameworks
- ContentTools
- CopperLicht
- Cross-origin resource sharing
- Crypton (framework)
- CSS framework
- CSS-in-JS
- CssQuery
- Cytoscape

== D ==
- D3.js
- Dart (programming language)
- DaVinci (software)
- Direct Web Remoting
- Document Update Markup Language
- DocumentCloud
- Dojo Toolkit
- Douglas Crockford
- Dropbox Paper

== E ==
- Echo (framework)
- ECMAScript
- ECMAScript version history
- Electron (software framework)
- Ember.js
- Emscripten
- Enyo (software)
- Espruino
- Etherpad
- Event bubbling
- Express.js
- Ext JS
- Ext.NET

== F ==
- Fast Healthcare Interoperability Resources
- Firebug (software)
- Font Bomb
- Foswiki
- Frank Karlitschek
- FusionCharts

== G ==
- GeoJSON
- Ghost (blogging platform)
- Gleam (programming language)
- Globalize
- Glow (JavaScript library)
- GlTF
- GNU LibreJS
- Gollum browser
- Google APIs
- Google Apps Script
- Google Charts
- Google Closure Tools
- Google Docs, Sheets and Slides
- Google Web Toolkit
- Greasemonkey
- Grunt (software)
- Gson
- Gulp.js

== H ==
- Hancom Office
- Helmi Technologies
- HOCON
- HTTPS Everywhere
- Hypertext Application Language

== I ==
- ICEfaces
- Immediately invoked function expression
- Index of JavaScript-related articles
- InScript (JavaScript engine)
- Ionic (mobile app framework)
- Isomorphic JavaScript
- IUI (software)

== J ==
- Jackson (API)
- Jan-Christoph Borchardt
- Jaql
- Jasmine (JavaScript testing framework)
- JavaScript
- JavaScript engine
- JavaScript framework
- JavaScript graphics library
- JavaScript library
- JavaScript Style Sheets
- JavaScript syntax
- JavaScript templating
- JData
- JerryScript
- JMesh
- John Resig
- JPlayer
- JQT (software)
- jQuery
- jQuery Mobile
- jQuery UI
- JQWidgets
- JScript
- JScript .NET
- JSDoc
- JSFuck
- JSGI
- JSHint
- JSLint
- JsMath
- JSON
- JSON Feed
- JSON Meta Application Protocol
- JSON Patch
- JSON streaming
- JSON Web Encryption
- JSON Web Signature
- JSON Web Token
- JSON-LD
- JSON-RPC
- JSON-WSP
- JSONiq
- JsonML
- JSONP
- JSONPath
- JsSIP
- JSX (JavaScript)
- JWt (Java web toolkit)

== K ==
- KaTeX
- KJS
- Knockout (web framework)
- Kopano (software)

== L ==
- Leaflet (software)
- Less (stylesheet language)
- Lightbox (JavaScript)
- List of ECMAScript engines
- List of JavaScript libraries
- List of server-side JavaScript implementations
- Lively Kernel
- LiveScript
- Locker (software)
- Lodash
- Lottie (file format)

== M ==
- Mailvelope
- MathJax
- Media queries
- Meteor (web framework)
- MindMup
- Minification (programming)
- Mocha (JavaScript framework)
- MochiKit
- Modernizr
- Monaca (software)
- Mongoose (MongoDB)
- MooTools
- Morfik
- Morfik FX
- Mozilla Raindrop
- Mustache (template system)

== N ==
- Nashorn (JavaScript engine)
- NativeScript
- Next Framework
- Nextcloud
- Node-RED
- Node.js
- Npm (software)

== O ==
- OpenAjax Alliance
- OpenJS Foundation
- OpenLaszlo
- OpenLayers
- OpenTravel Alliance
- OpenUI5
- OpenWebGlobe
- ORBX.js
- OwnCloud

== P ==
- Parallax scrolling
- PDF.js
- Pentadactyl
- Plotly
- PM2 (software)
- Polymer (library)
- Popcorn.js
- PostCSS
- Processing.js
- Progressive enhancement
- Prototype JavaScript Framework
- Prototype pollution
- Proxy auto-config
- Puffin Browser
- Push technology

== Q ==
- Qooxdoo
- QtScript
- QUnit

== R ==
- Raphaël (JavaScript library)
- React (JavaScript library)
- Redux (JavaScript library)
- RGraph
- Rhino (JavaScript engine)
- River Trail (JavaScript engine)

== S ==
- Sajax
- Samy (computer worm)
- Seed (programming)
- Sencha Touch
- Server-side JavaScript implementations
- Serverless Framework
- ShapeJS
- Smart client
- Smile (data interchange format)
- Socket.IO
- SpiderMonkey
- SproutCore
- Spry framework
- Starling Framework
- Study Notes
- Svelte
- SVG-edit
- SWFObject

== T ==
- Taiwan Fellowship Editor (e-book editor)
- Template:JavaScript
- Thing Description
- ThinkFree Office
- Three.js
- TiddlyWiki
- TinyMCE
- Titanium SDK
- TypeScript

== U ==
- Underscore.js
- Unobtrusive JavaScript
- Userscript
- Userscript manager

== V ==
- V8 (JavaScript engine)
- Variable hoisting
- Velocity (JavaScript library)
- Verge3D
- VisualEditor
- Vue.js

== W ==
- WAI-ARIA
- WASM (WebAssembly)
- WaveMaker
- Web Application Messaging Protocol
- Web worker
- WebApp.Net
- WebGL
- Webix
- Webpack
- WebTorrent
- WinJS
- Wink toolkit
- Wt (web toolkit)
- WYMeditor

== X ==
- XMLHttpRequest
- XMLSpy
- Yamanner
- Yeoman (software)
- YUI Library
- YUI Rich Text Editor

== Z ==
- Zarafa (software)
- Zimbra
- ZK (framework)
