= Comparison of JavaScript charting libraries =

There are different JavaScript charting libraries available. Below is a comparison of which features are available in each.

Library Name	License	Free	Supported Chart Types													Supported Bar Chart Types					Other Features		Interactivity		Rendering Technologies			Databinding	HTML 5 Canvas
Library Name	License	Free	Line	Timeline	Scatter	Area	Pie	Donut	Bullet	Radar	Funnel	Gantt	Network	Grouped	Mind Mapping	Stacked	Negative	Discrete	Horizontal	3D	Legends	Animation	Mouse Over	onClick	HTML5 Canvas	SVG	VML	AxisXY	WebGL rendering
AG Charts	MIT (Community version) or proprietary (Enterprise version)	'Community' version free; 'Enterprise' version paid	Yes	Yes	Yes	Yes	Yes	Yes	Yes	Yes	Yes	No	No	Yes	No	Yes	Yes	Yes	Yes	No	Yes	Yes	Yes	Yes	Yes	No	No	Yes	No
AnyChart	Proprietary	Free for education and non-profit use. Paid for commercial applications.	Yes	Yes	Yes	Yes	Yes	Yes	Yes	Yes	Yes	Yes	Yes	Yes		Yes	Yes	Yes	Yes	Yes	Yes		Yes	Yes	No	Yes	Yes	Yes	No
Chart.js	MIT	Yes	Yes	Yes	Yes	Yes	Yes	Yes	No	Yes	No	No	No	Yes		Yes	Yes	Yes	Yes		Yes		Yes	Yes	Yes	No	No	No	No
Cytoscape.js	MIT	Yes	No	No	No	No	No	No	No	No	No	No	Yes	No		No	No	No	No		No		Yes	Yes	Yes	No	No	Yes	No
D3.js, formerly Protovis	BSD-3	Yes	Yes	Yes	Yes	Yes	Yes	Yes	Yes	Yes	Yes	Yes	Yes	Yes		Yes	Yes	Yes	Yes		Yes		Yes	Yes	No	Yes	No	Yes	No
Dojo Charting, part of Dojo Toolkit	BSD or AFL	Yes	Yes	No	Yes	Yes	Yes	No	No	No	No	No	No	Yes		Yes	Yes	No	Yes		Yes		Yes	Yes	Yes	Yes	Yes		No
FusionCharts	Proprietary	Free for personal and non-commercial uses. Paid for commercial applications.	Yes	Yes	Yes	Yes	Yes	Yes	Yes	Yes	Yes	Yes	Yes	Yes		Yes	Yes	Yes		Yes	Yes		Yes	No	Yes	Yes			No
Google Charts	Free	Yes	Yes	Yes	Yes	Yes	Yes	Yes	No	No	Yes	Yes	Yes	Yes		Yes	Yes	Yes	Yes	Yes	Yes		Yes	Yes	Yes	Yes	Yes	Yes	No
Raphaël	MIT	Yes	Yes	No	Yes	No	Yes	No	No	No	No	No	No	Yes		Yes	No	No	Yes		Yes		Yes	No	No	Yes	No		No
plotly.js	MIT	Yes	Yes	Yes	Yes	Yes	Yes	Yes	Yes	Yes	Yes	Yes	via Python	Yes		Yes	Yes	Yes	Yes	Yes	Yes		Yes	Yes	No	Yes	No		Yes
RGraph	MIT	Yes	Yes	No	Yes	Yes	Yes	Yes	Yes	Yes	Yes	Yes	No	Yes		Yes	Yes	No	Yes	Yes	Yes		Yes	Yes	Yes	Yes	No		No
TeeChart JS	MIT	Yes	Yes	Yes	Yes	Yes	Yes	Yes	Yes	Yes	No	Yes	No	Yes		Yes	Yes	Yes	Yes	Yes	Yes		Yes	Yes	Yes	Yes	No		Yes

== See also ==
- Ext JS
- List of JavaScript libraries
