= List of charting software =

There are many different types of software available to produce charts.

A number of notable examples (with their own Wikipedia articles) are given below and organized according to the programming language or other context in which they are used.

== Delphi - VCL and FireMonkey (FMX) ==
- TeeChart - Native VCL Charting component with support to Embarcadero Windows IDEs (RAD Studio, Delphi and C++ Builder) and FireMonkey. Commercial license

== Java ==
- JFreeChart – Free Java based chart software
- TeeChart – Java charting library. Commercial license

== JavaScript ==
- AnyChart - HTML5/SVG/VML, free or commercial
- Chart.js - HTML5 Canvas, MIT license
- D3.js – HTML5/CSS3/SVG, BSD license
- Dojo Charting
- ExtJS 4 Charts – HTML5/SVG/Canvas, GPL or Commercial license
- FusionCharts - JavaScript/HTML5. Commercial license
- LiveGap charts - HTML5/SVG, free
- Google Charts - HTML5/SVG/VML, free
- jqxChart - SVG/VML/HTML5 chart. Free and commercial licences
- Plotly.js - MIT license
- RGraph - HTML5/SVG/Canvas, MIT license
- TeeChart JS – Cross-browser HTML5 Canvas, Open Source license
- VisJS – Accepts the DOT graph description language as input for network graphs
- Webix UI - JavaScript/HTML5, Free or Commercial license

== .NET ==
- TeeChart - Native C#.NET Charting Control (ASP.NET/MVC/WPF/Silverlight/Windows Forms/WebForms/Universal Windows Platform (UWP)/Xamarin/iOS/Android) Commercial license
- Visifire – Single API for desktop, web and mobile. (Windows 8/WPF/Silverlight/Windows Phone)

== Pascal and ObjectPascal ==
- TeeChart – For Delphi. Commercial version. Bundled with Delphi IDE
- TAChart - Charting component for the Lazarus IDE

== PHP ==
- TeeChart – For all PHP development environments including Delphi for PHP. Free Open Source and Commercial versions

== Python ==
- Matplotlib - PSF license
- Plotly - MIT license

== R ==
- R: Extensive support for publication-quality charting in both the base system and contributed packages.

== S ==
- S-Plus: Built-in charting commands, extended by external packages

== Spreadsheets ==
- EditGrid – web-based spreadsheet with charting capabilities
- Google Sheets – Online spreadsheet with built-in charting function for basic chart types
- KChart – the charting tool of the Calligra Suite
- LibreOffice Calc - Built-in charting function for basic chart types
- Microsoft Excel – Built-in charting function for basic chart types
- Apache OpenOffice Calc - Built-in charting function for basic chart types
- Numbers – iWork spreadsheet application with charting capabilities
- Webix UI - JavaScript/HTML5, Commercial license

== See also ==
- Comparison of JavaScript charting frameworks
- List of information graphics software
- Mathematical software
- PGF/TikZ – Graphics languages
- Plotting software
