= PM2 (disambiguation) =

PM2 may refer to:

- Parallel Multithreaded Machine, a software for parallel networking of computers
- PM2 (software), a software for Node.js process management
- PM² (PM squared), a project management methodology developed by the European Commission
- Paper Mario 2, a 2004 GameCube game
  - Paper Mario 2 (remake), 2024 remake released for the Nintendo Switch
- Pindad PM2, an Indonesian submachine gun
- PM2, a suborbital test vehicle of the New Shepard rocket made by American Aerospace company Blue Origin
