= Mongoose (disambiguation) =

Mongoose refers to two types of carnivorous mammals.

Mongoose or The Mongoose may also refer to:

== Personal nickname ==
- Tom McEwen (drag racer) (1937–2018), American drag racer nicknamed "The Mongoose",
- Adam Rose (wrestler) (born 1979), South African professional wrestler commonly called "The Radical Mongoose", also shortened to "The Mongoose"
- Henry John Temple, 3rd Viscount Palmerston (1784–1865), British Prime Minister nicknamed "The Mongoose"

== Brands and enterprises ==
- Mongoose (bicycles), a brand name of bicycles produced by Pacific Cycle
- Mongoose Publishing, British manufacturer of role-playing books, pewter miniatures, and card games

== Media and music ==
- The Mongoose (film), an upcoming film starring Liam Neeson
- "Mongoose", a song by Fu Manchu from the albums Eatin' Dust and California Crossing
- Mongoose Play, a traditional play from Saint Kitts
- Mongoose R.I.P., a novel
- Operation Mongoose (Once Upon a Time), a story
- Tour of the Mongoose, a concert tour by Shakira

== Fictional characters ==
- Mongoose (comics), a supervillain appearing in comic books published by Marvel Comics
- The Mongoose, a hitman in the graphic novel XIII
- The Mongoose, a pulp fiction character created by Johnston McCulley (1883–1958)

== Military ==
- Agusta A129 Mangusta ("Mongoose"), attack helicopter
- HMS Mongoose (1799), a Dutch brig captured by the Royal Navy in 1799 or 1800
- Mongoose Gang, a Grenadian private army that operated from 1967–1979

== Technology ==
- Mongoose (web server)
- Mongoose, an application development platform created and distributed by Infor
- Armstrong Siddeley Mongoose, a British aero engine developed in the 1920s
- Mongoose-V, a series of 32-bit computer processors used for NASA satellites
- Mongoose (MongoDB), a JavaScript library for programming in Node.js
- Mongoose OS, an operating system
- Mongoose, a CPU used in Samsung Exynos processors

== Other uses ==
- Cuban Project, also known as Operation Mongoose, a covert CIA operation against Fidel Castro
- Operation Mongoose (2003), an American cave clearing operation
- Mongoose Cricket Bat, a cricket bat for 20/20 games
