= Highrise (documentary) =

Multimedia documentary project about life in residential highrises

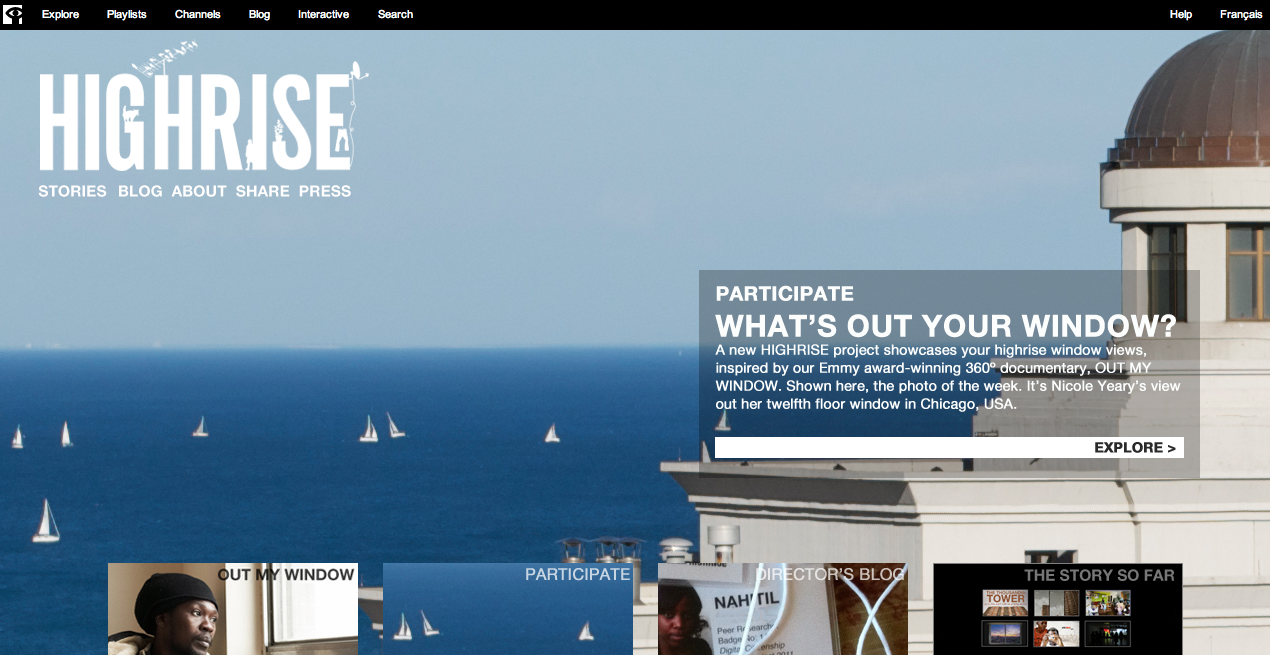
- The homepage of the website
- Website type: Web documentary
- Available in: English
- Owner: National Film Board of Canada
- Website: highrise.nfb.ca
- Commercial: No
- Registration: No
- Launched: 2009

Highrise is a multi-year, multimedia documentary project about life in residential highrises, directed by Katerina Cizek and produced by Gerry Flahive for the National Film Board of Canada (NFB). The project, which began in 2009, includes five web documentaries—The Thousandth Tower, Out My Window, One Millionth Tower, A Short History of the Highrise and Universe Within: Digital Lives in the Global Highrise—as well as more than 20 derivative projects such as public art exhibits and live performances.

In March 2013, the NFB and The New York Times announced a partnership entitled A Short History of the Highrise, which resulted in four short documentaries about life in highrise buildings, utilizing images from the newspaper's photo archives for the first three films, and user-submitted images for the final film.

Until mid-2015, Cizek collaborated with the Massachusetts Institute of Technology's OpenDocLab unit on developments for the Highrise project as part of MIT's Visiting Artists Program.

In June 2015, Universe Within: Digital Lives in the Global Highrise was launched as the final installment of Highrise.

In addition to awards won by individual webdocs in the series, the Highrise project received the Canadian Urban Institute's 2013 Global City and Innovation Urban Leadership Award.

The total budget for Highrise was CAD$2.8 million.

== The Thousandth Tower (2010) ==
The first production in Highrise is a citizen media project by six residents in a multi-cultural highrise complex in the Toronto neighbourhood of Rexdale. Project participants were found after a year of research and worked closely with facilitators: Heather Frise, Maria-Saroja Ponnambalam and Katerina Cizek. Residents were provided with digital cameras and a blog and met weekly with filmmakers over a six-month period for training in lighting techniques and writing. The residential complex was a test site in the City of Toronto's plan to renovate and beautify highrise residences.

=== Release ===
The Thousandth Tower premiered May 12, 2010 at an event at Toronto City Hall.

== Out My Window (2010) ==
Out My Window is a web documentary exploring the lives of families living in high-rise buildings in 13 cities around the world. The website is produced by National Film Board of Canada as part its collaborative documentary project Highrise. Out My Window was shot in Chicago, Toronto, Montreal, Havana, São Paulo, Amsterdam, Prague, Istanbul, Beirut, Bangalore, Phnom Penh, Tainan, and Johannesburg.

Cizek spent one year researching the project prior to starting production in August 2009. To locate characters and stories, Cizek and a team of researchers (Heather Frise, Maria-Saroja Ponnambalam, Paramita Nath) worked with a network of journalists, filmmakers and photographers around the world, directing them remotely from Toronto via email and Skype. However, not all communication was so instantaneous: a story from Havana had to be hand-delivered by the photographer, months after it was commissioned, without the chance for any direction from Cizek. Overall, 22 stories had been commissioned, with 9 stories dropped for various reasons during the production process.

Photos were digitally combined to create 360-degree scenes, in which viewers can explore the lives of apartment inhabitants, browsing interiors or navigating deeper to view embedded stories. Imaginarius, a Kitchener, Ontario-based multimedia production company, collaborated with Highrise Technical Director Branden Bratuhin and worked with over 1,000 photos to produce the 360-degree effect.

In Toronto, Amsterdam and Havana, Cizek also used a five-lens, 360-degree camera created by Amsterdam-based tech company Yellowbird to shoot interactive music video sequences.

=== Release ===
The site went live in October 2010. Out My Window was also presented at International Documentary Film Festival Amsterdam in November 2010. It has also been licensed to the SBS Australia website.

=== Awards ===
Out My Window received the inaugural IDFA DocLab Award for Digital Storytelling. In April 2011, it received the International Digital Emmy Award in the category of digital program: non-fiction. In April 2011, the web documentary was nominated for a Webby Award for Best Use of Photography in the Websites category. On May 10, 2011, Out My Window received the New Media Award at the One World Media Awards.

== One Millionth Tower (2011) ==
One Millionth Tower is a 2011 NFB interactive web documentary by Katerina Cizek that gives people living in residential skyscrapers the opportunity to work with architects and animators to reimagine their homes in 3D virtual space. The project focuses on two high-rise apartment buildings in Etobicoke. The webdoc allows users to navigate through their high-rise neighborhood, displaying the current state of urban decay, then activating features to show how residents would change their world, such as an animation showing where a new playground or garden would go. One Millionth Tower also features images from Flickr, Google Street Views and real-time weather data from Yahoo.

According to transmedia creator Anita Ondine Smith, NFB interactive projects like One Millionth Tower are helping to position Canada as a major player in digital storytelling.

One Millionth Tower was originally planned by Cizek as a linear animated documentary about reinvigorating urban housing complexes, showcasing residents’ ideas for improving their homes in the tower, but evolved into an interactive project in 3D space. One Millionth Tower was influenced by the NFB's Challenge for Change program for participatory media, which put media creation into the hands of citizens in the 1960s and 70s.

=== Technology ===
One Millionth Tower was created using HTML5, WebGL, Three.js and other open source JavaScript libraries, and utilizes Mozilla Foundation's Popcorn.js technology to add interactivity to its online videos. Utilizing Mozilla's Web-based graphics library, One Millionth Tower is the first 3D web documentary to not require an Adobe Flash plug-in.

=== Release ===
One Millionth Tower premiered simultaneously on Wired.com and the Mozilla Festival in London on November 5, 2011. Beginning January 2012, excerpts were being screened in Toronto subway stations.

=== Awards ===
One Millionth Tower was named Best Original Program Produced for Digital Media, Non-Fiction at the 1st Canadian Screen Awards.

== A Short History of the Highrise (2013) ==
A Short History of the Highrise is an interactive documentary that "explores the 2,500-year global history of vertical living and issues of social equality in an increasingly urbanized world." The centerpiece of the project is four short films: Mud, Concrete and Glass have been created with images from The New York Times's visual archives, while a fourth film, Home, is being made with user-submitted images. The interactive site will incorporate the films and also offer additional archival materials, text and microgames. The series is produced by Op-Docs, the Times' editorial department's forum for short, opinionated documentaries, and the NFB, as part of its HIGHRISE project.

=== Release ===
A Short History of the Highrise premiered as part of the Film Society of Lincoln Center’s New York Film Festival Convergence program on September 30, 2013 and online at NYTimes.com in October.

=== Awards ===
In April 2014, it received a Peabody Award. In June 2014, it received the Sheffield Innovation Award from the 2014 Sheffield Doc/Fest. In the fall of 2014, it received a News and Documentary Emmy Award. In February 2015, A Short History of the Highrise was named Best Original Program or Series produced for Digital Media - Non-Fiction at the 3rd Canadian Screen Awards.

== Universe Within: Digital Lives in the Global Highrise (2015) ==
The final installment, Universe Within: Digital Lives in the Global Highrise, is an interactive look at how residents in highrise buildings around the world connect online. The U.S. premiere was hosted by CityLab.

The project hired 14 residents in a Toronto highrise complex who went door-to-door to neighbors about their digital lives, and found that 80% of households had Internet access either at home or through their mobile device, despite their low-income status. This led Cizek to conclude that "there’s a real, invisible story here that we’re not seeing in the media or even in academic literature about how the digital maps out in the vertical, so we went to over 20 locations around the world, to speak with [people] – through local journalists and photographers – and to find stories of how the digital and the vertical intersect in really intimate, personal and political ways."

Universe Within users are asked to choose between three avatars who discuss their own personal histories and guide viewers through the story based on their input. Cizek has called the project is what the director calls "a whole larger than the sum" of previous Highrise installments, combining the international aspects of previous projects with deeper community-based research.

Universe Within incorporates research by Deborah Cowen, an associate professor of geography at the University of Toronto and colleague Emily Paradis, a senior research associate whose work focuses on economic disparity, to look at how residents in low-income highrises use technology to combat isolation and the digital divide. Stories include a person with ALS in Tokyo, an ex-convict in Harlem, a Saudi woman comic and a UN-sponsored refugee in Toronto, as well as residents in Worli, a Mumbai neighbourhood, who resist the expropriation of their homes in the Campa Cola Compound.

Universe Within took Cizek and the NFB four years to make and cost CAD $628,000.

=== Technology ===
Cizek has stated that Universe Within is the most technologically advanced of all the Highrise projects, using point cloud data to create the avatars through a collaboration with Highrise Technical Director Branden Bratuhin and Toronto-based digital agency, Secret Location.

=== Awards ===
On March 8, 2016, Universe Within received the award for Best Original Interactive Production Produced for Digital Media at the 4th Canadian Screen Awards.

At the 2016 Webby Awards, Universe Within received the Webby for Online Film & Video/Best Use of Interactive Video.
