= River Trail =

There are many uses for River Trail:

- River Trail (Arizona), a hiking trail in Grand Canyon National Park, located in the U.S. state of Arizona
- Greenbrier River Trail, a hiking and biking rail trail located in the U.S. state of West Virginia
- New River Trail, a hiking and biking rail trail located in the U.S. state of Virginia. It is designated a National Recreation Trail
- River Trail (British Columbia), a Fraser Canyon Gold Rush-Cariboo Gold Rush trail along the Fraser River during the colonial era of what is now the Canadian province of British Columbia
- Lansing River Trail, a hiking and biking trail located in the U.S. state of Michigan
- River Trail (JavaScript engine), a JavaScript engine developed by Intel, which allows parallel processing.
- River Trail (UTA station), a Utah Transit Authority station
