= Raindrops (disambiguation) =

Raindrops are drops of atmospheric liquid water.

Raindrop or Raindrops may also refer to:

- "Raindrop" by BGYO, from the 2026 EP On Demand
- Raindrop Prelude, Op. 28, No. 15, by Frédéric Chopin
- The Raindrops, a New York pop group
- "Raindrops" (Basement Jaxx song), 2009
- "Raindrops" (Dee Clark song), 1961
- "Raindrops" (Stunt song), 2006
  - "Raindrops (Encore Une Fois)", a mashup by Sash!
- "Raindrops (Insane)", a song by Metro Boomin and Travis Scott
- "Rain Drop", the B-side of IU's 2010 single "Nagging"
- "Rain Drop", a song by NCT 127 from their 2024 album Walk
- Raindrops, the reissue of the album Steve Kuhn Live in New York
- "Raindrops", a song by Jeremih from the album Jeremih
- "Raindrops", a 2006 song by Pitbull featuring Anjuli Stars from the album El Mariel
- "Raindrops", a 2026 song by Rick Astley
- "Raindrops (An Angel Cried)", a song by Ariana Grande from the album Sweetener
- Mozilla Raindrop, a messaging application

== See also ==
- Raindrop cake, a type of dessert
