= Campa Cola Compound case =

Legal case in India

BMC v. Campa Cola Residents
- Court: Supreme Court of India
- Full case name: BMC v. Campa Cola Residents
- Decided: 2014

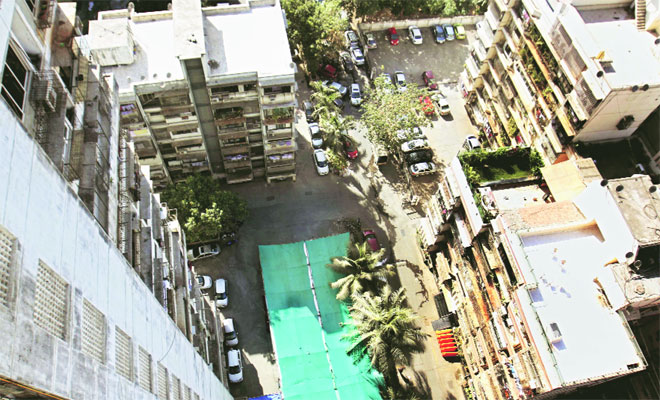
Image of the compound from one of the buildings

Campa Cola Compound Case is based on the judicial process, and the controversy over the Campa Cola Compound, an apartment complex in the southern part of Worli in South Mumbai, India.

== History ==
The residents claim that they bought the apartments with the understanding that they would get the Occupancy Certificates ("OC") in due course. The Supreme Court has held that the residents had purchased the flats knowing that they were unauthorized. Since 2005, the residents have been in litigation with Brihanmumbai Municipal Corporation (BMC), the local government, trying to prevent the BMC from razing the building. The society rose to national attention because of a court judgment that deemed construction beyond five floors illegal, and called for razing it down. The society is occupied by around 230 families who have been residing there for over 25 years. It has seven buildings namely Midtown Apartments, Orchid Tower, Patel Apartments 7A & 7B, Esha Ekta Apartments, BY Apartments & Shubh Apartments. The Supreme Court on 30 May 2014 declined to stay the eviction of the residents. As per an earlier Supreme Court order, the residents of Campa Cola society will have to vacate their apartments by 31 May 2014.

On 20 June 2014, BMC arrived at Campa Cola Compound to cut the essential services like water, electricity and gas.

On 22 June 2014, The residents after meeting with Chief Minister Chavan agreed to allow the BMC officials to cut the essential supplies and co-operate with officials to pave way for their resettlement.

== Support from the public and political parties ==
Over the last two years, the Campa Cola Compound Litigation has received mixed support from the public, political parties, as well as certain celebrities. Lata Mangeshkar and Raj Thackeray have extended their support to the inhabitants.

== See also ==
- Universe Within, a 2015 Canadian web documentary about citizen engagement in highrises, including the Campa Cola Compound.
