= SpiderOak =

American technology corporation

SpiderOak Inc.
- Industry: Computer security
- Founded: 2006
- Headquarters: Reston Town Center, Fairfax County, Virginia, United States
- Area served: United States
- Key people: Executive Chairman Charles Beames; CEO David Pearah
- Products: OrbitSecure
- Services: Software; Satellite mesh networking security; Zero-trust architecture
- Website: spideroak.com

SpiderOak Inc. is a US-based software company focused on satellite cybersecurity. The company began in 2006 as a producer of a collaboration tool, online backup and file hosting service that allows users to access and share data using a cloud-based server.

SpiderOak evolved into a space cybersecurity company and first tested its software in space in June 2023. It has partnered with Lockheed Martin, Raytheon, and the Department of Defense.

== History ==
SpiderOak was founded in 2007 by Ethan Oberman and Alan Fairless as an encrypted private backup program. In 2013, SpiderOak began developing the Crypton framework, "a JavaScript framework for building applications where the server doesn't know the contents it's storing on behalf of users." Crypton is an open-source project allowing developers to easily add encryption security to mobile applications. By mid-2014, according to Oberman, SpiderOak had near 1 million users.

Its first offering, its online backup service later branded "SpiderOak ONE", launched in December 2007. SpiderOak is accessible through an app for Windows, Mac and Linux computer platforms, and Android, N900 Maemo and iOS mobile platforms.

According to SpiderOak, the software used encrypted cloud storage and client-side encryption key creation, so SpiderOak employees could not access users' information. SpiderOak differentiated itself from its competition by this kind of encryption, in provision for syncing files and folders across multiple devices, and in automatic de-duplication of data.

Some components of SpiderOak ONE were open-source; in 2009, the company announced its intent for the SpiderOak ONE code to be fully open-source in the future. As of 2016, the SpiderOak One client's source code is only available open-source for mobile platforms, with no current plans to make the desktop client's code open-source. SpiderOak used to provide an open-source password manager named Encryptr, which was discontinued in March 2021. The source code for SpiderOak's group messaging application Semaphor is published to allow auditing.

By 2014, SpiderOak was headquartered in Chicago and employed 42 staff, headed by CEO Alan Fairless. Around the same time, the company had offices in Chicago and Kansas City, and was hiring remote employees inside and outside of the US. In 2015, SpiderOak raised $3.5 million in Series A funding, bringing its total funding to around $9 million.

In February 2017, SpiderOak discontinued using the phrase "zero knowledge" to describe their SpiderOak ONE service following public criticism that the phrase conflicted with the mechanism behind cryptographic zero-knowledge proofs. SpiderOak adopted the phrase "no knowledge" for their marketing. In November 2017, founder Alan Fairless was replaced as CEO by Christopher Skinner, who announced that the company would be expanding into enterprise software, partially funded by a $2 million Series B round.

David Pearah became CEO in 2020. Charles Beames became executive chairman of the company in 2022. In January 2023, the company raised $16.4 million in a financing round "to make a full-tilt push into building its space business."

In May 2023, the company received investments from the venture capital arms of Accenture, Raytheon Technologies and Stellar Ventures to "speed up the deployment of zero-trust, cybersecurity platforms for government and commercial clients operating in the space sector." In June 2023, the company first demonstrated its OrbitSecure cybersecurity software in space on a Ball Aerospace prototype payload. In July 2023, the company demonstrated its OrbitSecure software on the International Space Station.

== OrbitSecure ==
As part of a pivot to space cybersecurity, in 2021 SpiderOak moved to an increased focus on its OrbitSecure cybersecurity software. The suite of products uses encryption and distributed-ledger software to operate a decentralized key management system. The company described OrbitSecure as providing "end-to-end cybersecurity for the Department of Defense's future Hybrid Space Architecture."

The platform relies on containerized workloads, in which pieces of code are bundled together with all the files they need to run independently of other blocks of information. This siloing of different applications makes for more efficient and secure data processing and transmission in orbit.

== See also ==
- List of password managers
- Comparison of file hosting services
- Comparison of file synchronization software
- Comparison of online backup services
- File synchronization
