= Isomorphic JavaScript =

JavaScript applications that run on both the client and server

Isomorphic JavaScript, also known as Universal JavaScript, describes JavaScript applications which run both on the client and the server.

== Name ==
The naming of the term 'Isomorphic JavaScript' has been a matter of controversy. The term 'isomorphic' was first coined by Charlie Robbins from Nodejitsu, in one of the company's blog posts. Spike Brehm, a software engineer from Airbnb, wrote another blog post using the same term. However, others have proposed to use the term Universal JavaScript instead.

== Frameworks ==
There have been several isomorphic JavaScript frameworks and libraries created, most notably Miso and Meteor. Others include Next.js, Nuxt, SvelteKit, Rendr, Derby, Ezel and Catberry.
