= Terms of Service; Didn't Read =

Website tracking other websites' legal documents and layperson opinions about such

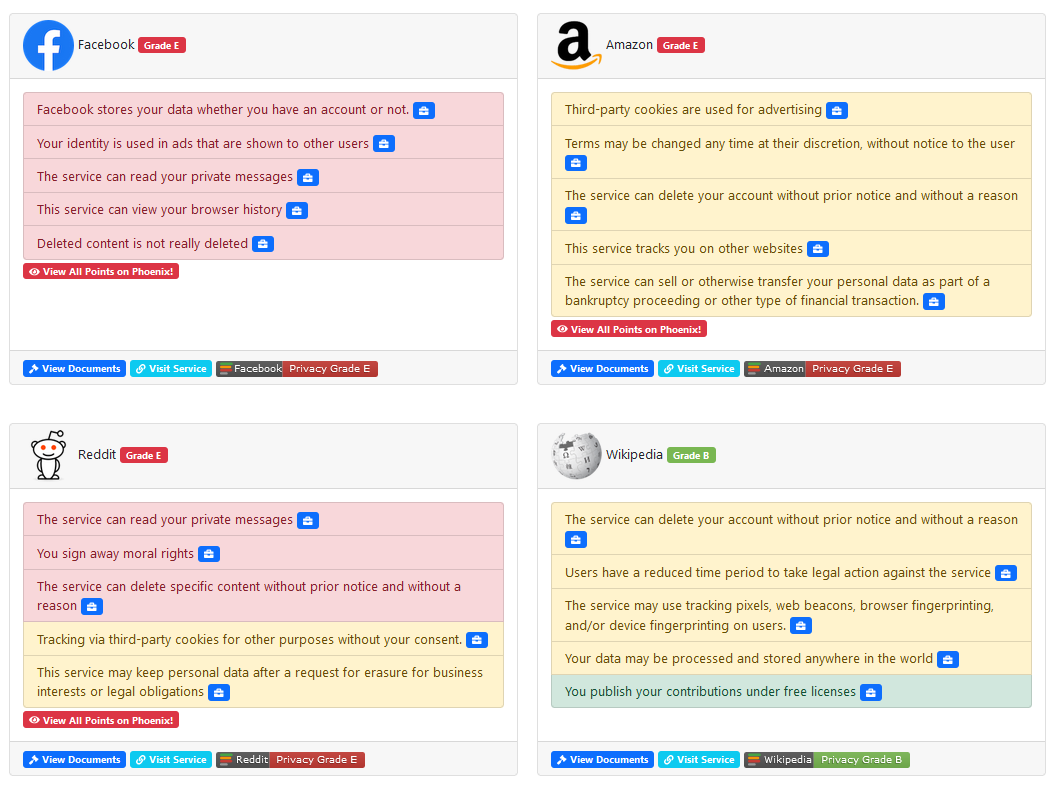
- A screenshot showing example ratings from ToS;DR
- Website: tosdr.org
- Launched: June 2012; 14 years ago
- Current status: Active
- Content license: CC BY-SA 3.0

Terms of Service; Didn't Read (ToS;DR) is a community project that aims to analyze and grade the Terms of Service (ToS) and privacy policies of major Internet sites and services. Each aspect of a ToS or privacy policy is assessed as positive, negative, blocker, or neutral. Services are graded from A (best) to E (worst) once a comprehensive list of cases has been reviewed by volunteer curators. The project's name is a play on the phrase too long; didn't read.

The project was founded in June 2012 by Hugo Roy, programmer Michiel de Jong, and designer Jan-Christoph Borchardt. It was led by Hugo Roy, when he was a law student, from 2012 to 2015. In 2020, the project was revived with a larger team.

The project offers a browser extension for Google Chrome, Microsoft Edge, Apple Safari, Mozilla Firefox and Opera, which shows the grade and a short description of the privacy policy if a website is compatible.

== History ==
Several sources of inspiration have been noted for ToS;DR, including Creative Commons' plain English summaries of licenses, EU energy efficiency ratings, and Aza Raskin's Privacy Icons.

As of 2024, ToS;DR's grading system had been integrated into Yorba, a privacy-oriented personal information management platform, to provide users with summarized evaluations of companies' privacy policies.
