= Yorba (software) =

- Original authors: Chris Zeunstrom, Nolan Cabeje, David Schmudde
- Initial release: 2022; 4 years ago
- Operating system: Web application
- Type: Personal information management
- Website: yorba.co

Yorba is a web-based personal information management platform for finding, monitoring, or deleting online accounts and subscriptions. Yorba is a participating member of Consumer Reports’ Data Rights Protocol (DRP) consortium that develops open technical standards for exercising consumer data rights under laws including the California Consumer Privacy Act.

== History ==
Yorba began as a research project around 2021. It was founded by Chris Zeunstrom (CEO), Nolan Cabeje (CDO) and David Schmudde (CTO).

Zeunstrom says he began developing Yorba after growing frustrated with managing numerous email accounts, noting overloaded inboxes create distraction and potential security vulnerabilities. Yorba’s early development was also influenced by security issues he encountered at a previous company, which had been affected by data breaches at a time when such incidents were becoming increasingly common.

In 2023, Yorba launched a private beta as a public benefit corporation funded through a give-back model operated by Zeunstrom's New York-based design firm, Ruca.

In January 2024, Yorba entered public beta and reported over 1,000 users, including 160 premium subscribers. At the time of the public beta launch, Yorba integrated with Gmail and announced plans to expand compatibility to other online services and cloud storage providers.

In September 2024, Yorba completed conformance testing under the Data Rights Protocol, an initiative developed by Consumer Reports, to establish a standard and open-source framework for securely transmitting consumer data rights requests under laws like the California Consumer Privacy Act. Yorba was named among twelve participating companies that implemented the protocol alongside OneTrust and Consumer Reports’ own Permission Slip app.

Yorba was one of nine startups selected as 2025 finalist in the Santander X Global Awards international entrepreneurship competition.

== Features ==
Yorba scans user inbox history data to identify online accounts, mailing lists, and possible data breaches. It uses natural language processing and machine learning to identify a user's accounts, services, and subscriptions.

The platform prompts password resets for compromised accounts and locates unused accounts. The platform also supports mailing list management by identifying and helping users unsubscribe from newsletters.

Paid subscribers can locate and cancel recurring charges. Yorba links with financial institutions in the U.S., Canada, and EU via Plaid Inc. to detect recurring charges and delete unwanted subscriptions.

== Privacy and Ethics ==
Yorba's founder has openly criticized dark patterns that make canceling services difficult, citing personal frustration with inbox clutter as part of his inspiration for Yorba.

Yorba offers privacy policy analysis in partnership with Amsterdam-based nonprofit Terms of Service; Didn’t Read, assigning grades based on invasiveness or ethical concerns.

As of 2024, the company described its pricing as designed to cover operational costs and sustain the platform without outside investment.
