= Nvidia GRID =

Family of GPUs by Nvidia

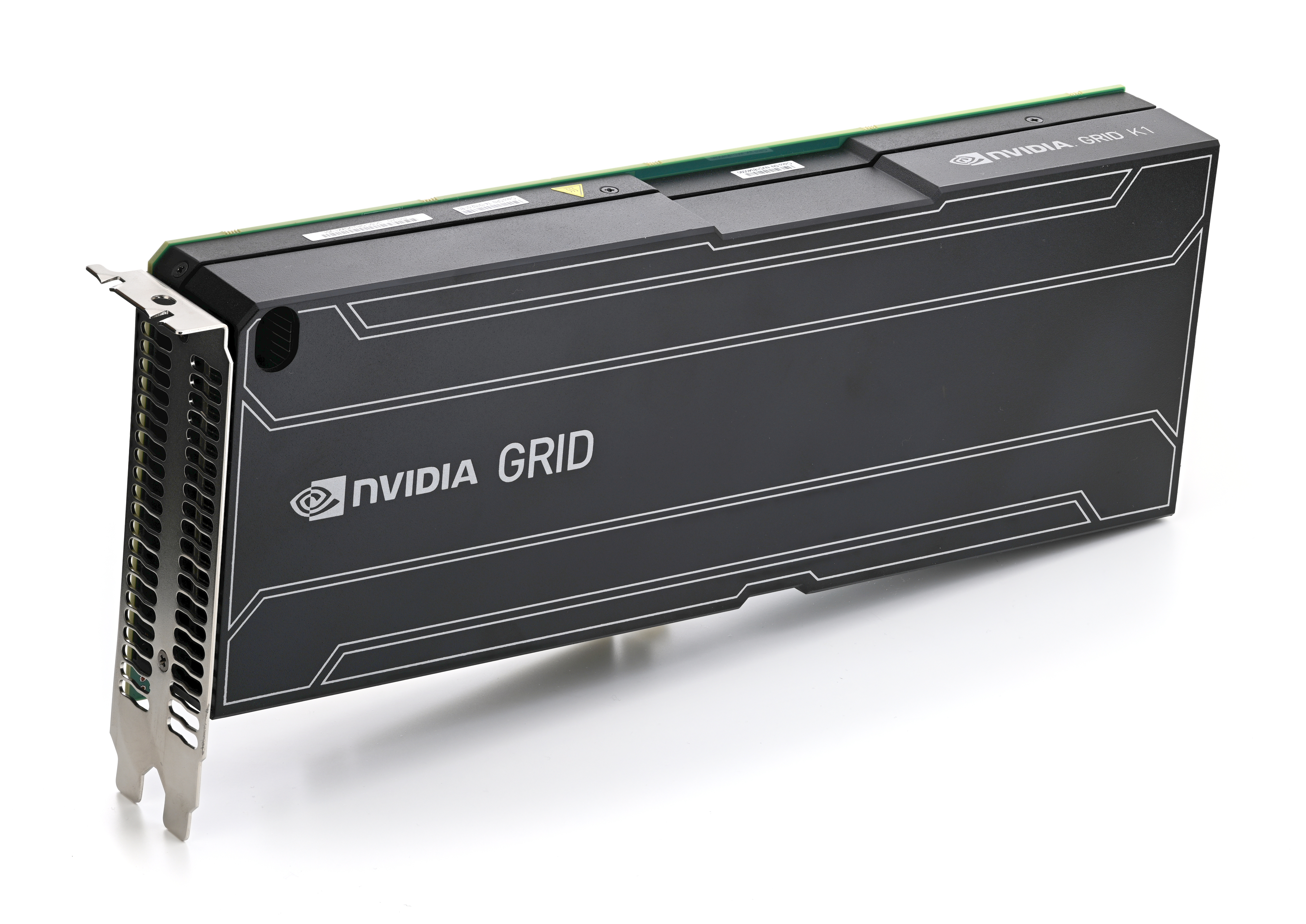
This GRID K1 GPU provides VDI for four seats using four independent GK107 GPUs with 4 GB of graphics memory each.

Nvidia GRID was a family of graphics processing units (GPUs) made by Nvidia, introduced in 2008, that were targeted specifically towards GPU virtualization and cloud gaming. The Nvidia GRID includes both graphics processing and video encoding into a single device which is able to decrease the input to display latency of cloud based video game streaming. It was previously used by Nvidia's GeForce Now, a paid cloud gaming service.

While many of Nvidia's cards are known for gaming, there has been a recent growth of business applications that are GPU-accelerated. The Nvidia GRID K1 and K2 are being integrated with Supermicro server clusters for use with 3D-intensive applications such as graphics and computer aided design (CAD). In 2015, Microsoft began including Nvidia GRID as part of its Azure Enterprise cloud platform targeted towards professionals such as engineers, designers and researchers.

Specifications
	GRID K1	Grid K2
Microarchitecture	Kepler	
Number of GPUs	4× GK107	2× GK104
Number of CUDA cores	4× 192	2× 1536
Memory site	4× 4 GB DDR3	2× 4 GB GDDR5
Max power	130 W	225 W
