= Ext.NET =

Suite of ASP.NET AJAX Web Controls

Ext.NET (known as Coolite until November 2010 and now part of the Object.Net suite) was a suite of professional ASP.NET AJAX Web Controls (Web forms + MVC) which includes the Sencha Ext JS JavaScript Framework.

The suite of web controls are built with a focus on bringing the Ext JS Framework to Visual Studio and the .NET Framework via a combination of server-side and client-side tools.
