= Next Framework =

- Developer(s): Next
- Type: Java development tools
- License: LGPL
- Website: http://www.nextframework.org

Next Framework is a Java framework for developing web applications based on Spring and Hibernate. While originally developed and supported only in Portuguese, an English worldwide version was created to be available in 2015, and since then it has developed to be available to use in multiple languages.
