= Parallels Workstation Extreme =

Workstation

- Developer(s): Parallels, Inc.
- Stable release: 4.0 / March 30, 2009
- Operating system: Microsoft Windows, Linux
- Platform: x86-compatible
- Type: Virtual machine
- License: Commercial Proprietary
- Website: Parallels Workstation

Parallels Workstation Extreme is the first workstation virtualization product that lets users virtualize graphics-intensive software programs such as geophysical simulation, financial analysis, and digital content creation programs commonly used by engineers and digital animators in virtual machines on Windows and Linux hosts.

To let users virtualize these resource-intensive programs, Parallels partnered with Intel and Nvidia and incorporated their technologies into Parallels Workstation Extreme.

== Overview ==
Like other virtualization software, Parallels Workstation Extreme uses a hypervisor to grant its virtual machines’ direct access to the host computer's hardware. However, instead of handling the processes within the virtual machine as other virtualization products do to render 3D graphics, Parallels Workstation Extreme uses Intel Virtualization Technology for Directed I/O to direct the multimedia directly back to the host's graphics cards while Nvidia's SLI Multi-OS allows the host machine and the virtual machine to each have their dedicated GPU. Each graphic application running in a virtual machine requires its own dedicated Nvidia Quadro FX 3800, 4800, or 5800 graphics card, which are the only graphics cards currently supported by the product.

To provide the hardware environment to support this mix of virtualization and graphics technologies, Hewlett-Packard partnered with Parallels and Nvidia to develop the HP Z800, a high-end PC that include Nvidia's Quadro FX GPUs and Intel's VT-d and Xeon processor.

=== Features ===
Parallels Workstation Extreme includes support for up to 16 CPU cores, 64 GB of RAM for guest OSs, 16 virtual network adapters per virtual machine and virtual drive sizes up to 2 TB. Users can use multiple monitors, display a different guest operating system in each screen and also move the mouse back and forth between monitors and OSs. Parallels Workstation Extreme load balances CPU resources as users move between the different OSs on the workstation.

The product also supports CLI, PXEboot and USB 2.0 devices. Users can utilize virtual machine templates, multiple snapshot capabilities and software development kits. Also included is Parallels Compressor, designed to compress the size of a virtual hard disk, and Parallels Image Tool, designed to increase or decrease the size of a virtual hard disk.

=== System requirements ===
Host requirements include:

- 64-bit Windows Vista, 64-bit Windows XP SP3 or 64-bit Red Hat Enterprise Linux 5.3 host operating system
- 1 or 2 Intel Xeon Processors 5500 series
- 8 GB RAM
- 10 GB disk space per virtual machine
- Supported NVIDIA Quadro FX graphics cards

Supported guest operating systems include 64-bit Windows Vista, 64-bit Windows XP SP3, Red Hat Enterprise Linux 4.7 and 5.3 and Fedora 10.

== See also ==
- Platform virtualization
- Graphics card
- Hypervisor
- Virtual machine
- Virtual disk image
