= WebApp.Net =

Open-source web application framework

- Developer(s): Chris Apers
- Initial release: May 8, 2008
- Stable release: 0.5.2 / November 16, 2009; 15 years ago
- Written in: JavaScript and CSS
- Operating system: iOS
- Platform: WebKit web app
- Type: web application framework
- License: BSD License
- Website: webapp-net.com

WebApp.Net (WAn) was an open-source web application framework by Chris Apers ("Chrilith") for the iPhone, iPod Touch and other WebKit based browsers. WebApp.Net used a combination of JavaScript, Cascading Style Sheets, and images to copy the native iPhone and iPod Touch user interfaces. Chris Apers was also the author of "Beginning iPhone and iPad Web Apps" published by Apress which was translated into Spanish and French.

== History ==
- 2010-02-06 - v0.5.2
- 2009.11.16 - v0.5.0
- 2008.10.03 - v0.3.9a
- 2008.05.08 - first released

== See also ==
- iPhone Web Applications
- Safire
- iUI (software)
- iWebKit
