= PM² =

Project management methodology

PM² (pronounced “P-M squared”) is a project management methodology developed and endorsed by the European Commission (EC). It is the official project management methodology of the EC, incorporating elements from a range of widely accepted best practices in project management and building heavily on PMBOK, PRINCE2, IPMA-ICB, CMMI, TEMPO, and operational experience from EU institutions.

== Introduction ==
In essence, the PM² methodology provides:

- Project governance structure
- Process guidelines
- Artefact templates
- Guidelines for using the artefacts
- Set of effective mindsets.

PM² certification exams are available in the 28 EU countries via Prometric, but are only available to EU institutions' staff. In 2016, the European Commission issued an open guide to the PM² methodology, freely available through the EU Bookshop/Publications. However, as of July 2017, the certification program is still available only to the EU institutions' staff.

A synopsis of PM² was published in 2018 by the European Commission (PM² Overview) and was translated in numerous languages to support the roll out of the methodology to the European (primarily) countries.

== History ==
The PM² methodology was developed in 2007, and the first version was released via the PM² Wiki in 2008. Some milestones in the development of methodology include:

- 2007: Introduction of roles and responsibilities for IT projects.
- 2008: Introduction of PM²
- 2009: Pilot implementation of PM²
- 2009 Project management courses for PM²
- 2011: Endorsement by CTI.
- 2012: Release of the PM² Training Programme for IT Projects
- 2012: Release of the PM² Guide, 1st Edition (PDF)
- 2012: Training Courses for Business Managers
- 2013: Release of the PM² Methodology 2.0 and the PM² Guide, 2st Edition (PDF)
- 2013: Introduction of PM² Certification Level-2
- 2014: Release of Agile@EC
- 2016: Release of Agile@EC Guide, 1st Edition
- 2015: Release of the PM² Methodology Guide ver. 2.5
- 2016: Release of the PM² Guide, Open Edition
- 2018: First Open PM² Conference
- 2018: Release of the PM² Guide ver. 3.0

== Supporting Bodies ==
=== Centre of Excellence in PM² (CoEPM²) ===
The purpose of the Centre of Excellence in PM² is to provide the European Commission and EU Institutions with high-quality Project Management infrastructure, support, training and consulting services. The CoEPM² supports the PM² Methodology, coordinates an inter-institutional Project Support Network (PSN), and promotes the wider adoption of PM² through the Open PM² Initiative.

=== The PM² Alliance ===
Member-driven and volunteer-led, the PM² Alliance is an international, not-for-profit organisation. Founded by PM² practitioners, the Alliance brings together individuals from institutions, companies and the academia to inspire dialogue, share resources, and address the field's challenges while promoting the wider adoption of the PM² Methodology.

==== The PM² Alliance Mission ====
The PM² Alliance carries the torch of the Open PM² vision, promotes and evolves PM², and takes it to places “where no PM² has gone before”. It brings the Open PM² community together, connecting PM² practitioners, trainers, experts and project managers from all over Europe and works with other Institutions and organisations in promoting better project management in Europe.

== Certifications ==
=== Centre of Excellence in PM² (CoEPM²) ===
The CoEPM² currently offers three PM² Certifications (available to EU Institutions Staff only, for now):

- PM² Certified
- Agile PM² Certified
- PM² Practitioner

For further information, you can visit the PM² wiki and the Agile PM² wiki.

=== The PM² Alliance ===
The PM² Alliance is committed to bringing the benefits of this certification to all EU Citizens for the purpose of the advancement of the PM² Methodology for the public good. The PM² Alliance Certification programme is available to all and has been designed to certify knowledge of the PM² methodology at various levels.

The PM² Alliance Certifications are not related to the EC's CoEPM² Training and Certification programme which is designed for (and available only to) EU Institutions Staff.

- PM² Basic Certification
- PM² Essentials Certification
- PM² Advanced Certification
- PM² Agile Certification
- PM² Trainer Certification

Staff of the EU Institutions who have already achieved a PM² certification through the EC's internal CoEPM² training and certification programme are entitled to receive a certification equivalence from the PM² Alliance.

== See also ==
- List of project management topics
- Gantt chart
- Work breakdown structure
- Comparison of project-management software
- Project Management Institute (PMI)
- AXELOS
