= RGraph =

HTML5 software library for charting written in native JavaScript

- Developers: Richard Heyes and community
- Initial release: 1 September 2008; 17 years ago
- Stable release: 7.00 / 15 August 2025; 9 months ago
- Written in: JavaScript
- Platform: Web
- Type: Data visualization, JavaScript library
- License: GNU General Public License
- Website: www.rgraph.net
- Repository: github.com/heyesr/rgraph

RGraph is an HTML5 software library for charting written in native JavaScript. It was created in 2008. RGraph started as an easy-to-use commercial tool based on HTML5 canvas only. It's currently freely available to use under the open-source GPL license and supports more than 50 chart types in both SVG and canvas.

== License ==
RGraph is dual licensed using the open source GNU General Public License 2.0 and commercial.

== Mentions ==
In July 2014, Salesforce made RGraph available to be plugged into the reporting and dashboard tools on its mobile platform. RGraph is among six third-party visualization tools available inside the dashboards, together with Google Charts, D3.js, CanvasJS, Chart.js, and Highcharts.

In a book "Android Cookbook: Problems and Solutions for Android Developers," RGraph is recommended as an alternative to creating Android charts in pure Java.

== Releases ==
RGraphs follows a frequent release schedule. Major milestones includes:

- Version 4.0 (2015): Introduced robust native SVG rendering alongside its legacy HTML5 canvas core.
- Version 6.0 (2021): Refactored core animation rendering sequences and CSS responsiveness guidelines.
- Version 7.0 (2025): Redesigned canvas high-definition resolution rendering for modern Retina and 4K displays.
- Version 7.11 (2026): Added native dumbbell chart variants across both canvas and SVG architectures.

== See also ==
- JavaScript framework
- JavaScript library
