= Wink toolkit =

Open-source framework for building mobile web applications

Wink Toolkit
- Developer: Dojo Foundation
- Stable release: 1.4.4 / July 30, 2013
- Written in: JavaScript
- Operating system: Cross-platform
- Type: JavaScript toolkit (or library)
- License: BSD License
- Website: http://www.winktoolkit.org

Wink, which stands for "Webapp Innovation Kit", is an open-source framework for building mobile web applications on devices such as the IPhone or Android (Android (operating system)). It is based on web technologies such as HTML, CSS, and JavaScript.

The project started in early 2009 at Orange Labs (France Telecom R&D). Since June 17, 2010, Wink is a project of the Dojo Foundation.

Wink toolkit provides all the basic functionalities of a JavaScript framework: from DOM manipulation to asynchronous HTTP requests and also some mobile oriented features like touch and gestures events handling.

Beyond that, wink toolkit offers advanced graphical components, like HTML 3D tag clouds and shapes or multitouch components.

== Packages ==
Wink toolkit is divided into 8 packages

- core, which contains all the heart of the kit
- ui, for all the graphical components
- ux, interactions components
- mm, multimedia package
- net, for network related tasks
- api, to handle low level HTML5 features
- fx, for CSS transitions and transform (either 2D or 3D)
- math, a set of mathematic libraries

It also includes an "Easy caching" mechanism.

== See also ==
- Dojo Toolkit
