= Font Bomb =

Javascript Bookmarklet

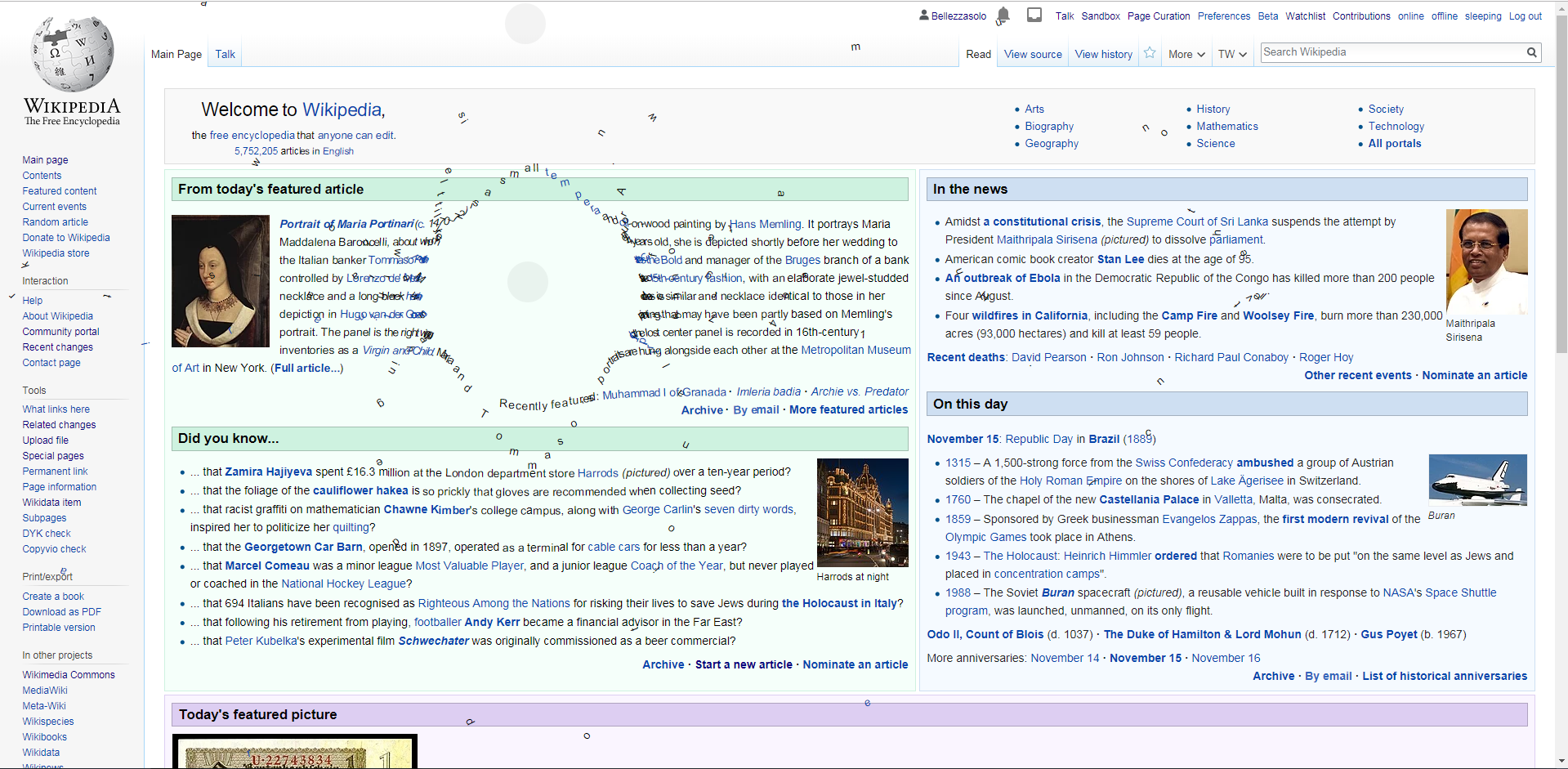
Font Bomb used on Wikipedia's main page

Font Bomb is a JavaScript bookmarklet to "Blow Up" web pages. When the script is loaded, clicking on a web page starts a countdown. When the countdown reaches zero, it uses Cascading Style Sheets to scatter nearby text across the page. The script wraps all affected letters in a tag, so that they can be moved individually.
