= Crypton (framework) =

Cryptographic web framework

- Developers: David Dahl, Cam Pedersen
- Initial release: March 1, 2013
- Stable release: 0.0.4 / January 7, 2015
- Repository: github.com/SpiderOak/crypton.git
- Written in: JavaScript
- Operating system: Cross-platform
- Type: JavaScript library
- License: AGPL, GPLv3
- Website: crypton.io

Crypton is a JavaScript library that allows one to write web applications where the server knows nothing of the contents a user is storing. This is done by use of cryptography, though the developer of the application does not need any cryptographic knowledge. It is designed to encrypt data inside a JavaScript context (either a browser extension, mobile application, or WebKit-based desktop application).

Crypton was created by SpiderOak, also known for their encrypted backup product, who were looking for a way for data to be securely encrypted without the need for users to download a separate program.
