= Sajax =

Open-source tool designed to help websites using the Ajax framework

- Stable release: 0.15 / April 13, 2017; 7 years ago
- Repository: github.com/ajenbo/sajax
- Written in: ASP, Cold Fusion, Io, Lua, PHP, Perl, Python, Ruby
- Platform: Cross-platform
- Size: 53.3 kB (zip) / 34.5 kB (tar.gz)
- Type: Ajax framework
- License: BSD license
- Website: github.com/AJenbo/Sajax

Sajax (Simple Ajax Toolkit), is an open-source tool designed to help websites using the Ajax framework (also known as XMLHttpRequest). It allows the programmer to call ASP, ColdFusion, Io, Lua, PHP, Perl, Python, or Ruby functions from their webpages via JavaScript without performing a browser refresh.

Sajax supports IE5+, Pocket IE, Opera 8+ (including mobile), Opera mini 4+, Safari 1.2+, Mozilla 0.94+ and Konqueror.
