= Morfik FX =

Tool for developing Ajax-based Webb applications

Morfik FX is a tool for developing Ajax-based Web applications. It is one of a family of tools from Morfik Technologies, a company based in Australia. Morfik FX is an update to a product previously called Morfik WebOS AppsBuilder and uses the Object Pascal programming language for writing all the application's code, for both the Web browser and Server portions.

Morfik FX provides a Rapid Application Development (RAD) environment for the creation of Web applications. This environment included a Visual Designer with WYSIWYG capabilities that supports a range of visual effects.

== Product History ==
The first Professional License for Morfik WebOS AppsBuilder (the precursor to Morfik FX), was by acquired by Greenpeace International in October, 2006, and two months later, Altium deployed the first commercial application built with WebOS AppsBuilder. It was a mashup with Salesforce.com applications which permitted a hierarchical view of all projects managed through Salesforce.com.

In March 2007, v1.0 was officially released and its name was changed to "Morfik 07"). See also here

In November 2008, v2.0 of the AppsBuilder product was officially released with an entirely redesigned interface. This release broke down the programming language support into separate versions called FX (Object Pascal) and BX (Basic). It was at this point that the Morfik FX product moniker was introduced.

In August 2009, Morfik released AppsBuilder 2.1 which, though numbered as a simple point update, contained a significant number of new features such as the ability to visually create Widgets (user created controls). With this release support for the C# programming language which was dropped with the release of 2.0, was reintroduced with a Morfik CX moniker.

In October 2010 Morfik released AppsBuilder 3.0 with improved support for Widgets and Packages. Version 3.0 of Morfik FX adds a new set of visual design objects which represent individual pages within an application. These objects make it much easier for developers to create the navigational structure of their applications in a manner that is search engine friendly.

In November 2010 Morfik Technologies, the maker of Morfik FX, was acquired by Altium Limited.

== Distinguishing Product Features ==
Morfik FX is a Web development tool that runs on the Windows operating system. The following are the most distinguishing features of Morfik FX:

- All coding for both the browser and server portions of the application is written in Object Pascal.
- Applications created with Morfik FX are 100% based on Ajax.
- All interface design is done visually, within the Morfik development environment.
- The server side portion of applications created with Morfik FX is compiled into native code for Windows or Linux.
- The browser side portion of applications created with Morfik FX is compiled into JavaScript, HTML, CSS and image files.
- The Morfik development environment can be extended, incorporating new controls and capabilities through the addition of packages which are created with Morfik FX itself.

== Visual Development ==
Morfik uses a WYSIWYG interface designer to allow the developer to visually create the interface for web-based applications. The visual designers built into the Morfik development environment closely parallel visual design tools for desktop application development, providing the same sort of capabilities for the creation Web applications.

While visually designing the interface of a Web application with Morfik FX the developer will create Forms which define the positioning of controls and their appearance and then combine these Forms in a higher level visual object called a Page.

== Web Services ==
Morfik provides two different ways for developers to create Web Service entry points in Web applications. In Morfik terminology these entry point are called Web Methods. There is a visual editor for defining the input and output parameters of Web Methods which also creates the boilerplate code for handling both the server and browser side to guide the developer. An experienced developer can, however, totally bypass the visual designer and just hand code the entry points which are implemented as specialized classes with special metadata attributes applied to them.

== See also ==
- Morfik
- Object Pascal
