= JPlayer =

Free open-source JavaScript library

jPlayer
- jPlayer Logo.
- Original author(s): Mark Panaghiston
- Developer(s): Happyworm
- Initial release: May 4, 2009
- Stable release: 2.9.2 / December 15, 2014
- Repository: github.com/jplayer/jPlayer
- Written in: JavaScript, ActionScript
- Size: 7.8 MB
- Type: Software framework
- License: MIT license
- Website: jplayer.org

jPlayer (jPlayer 2) is a free and open-source JavaScript library developed as a jQuery plugin which facilitates the embedding of web based media, notably HTML5 audio and video in addition to Adobe Flash based media.

== History ==
jPlayer was first beta-released in May 2009 after 6 months of development by Happyworm. The library stayed in beta for 9 months. In February 2010, Happyworm released the first official version of jPlayer.

"We let the beta simmer a while. jPlayer worked as a plugin, but it was not particularly well written, with many methods dangling on the jQuery object. We incorporated key parts of the jQuery UI core into jPlayer to solve this. Along with a bunch of other tweaks here and there, we released the first official version in February 2010." - jPlayer Team, December 2010.

jPlayer's development continued, and by July 2010 the final version of jPlayer the jQuery audio player plugin was released. After, jPlayer has been entirely reworked and released as jPlayer 2 in December 2010, now supporting video.

"We wanted to enable video in jPlayer. Ironically, the HTML5 solution took about 10 minutes to get the basics working." - jPlayer Team, December 2010.
