= Funnel chart =

Funnel charts are a type of chart, often used to represent stages in a sales process and show the amount of potential revenue for each stage. This type of chart can also be useful in identifying potential problem areas in an organization's sales processes. A funnel chart is similar to a stacked percent bar chart.

== Composition ==
A funnel chart displays values as progressively decreasing proportions amounting to 100 percent in total. The size of the area is determined by the series value as a percentage of the total of all values. Any funnel consists of the higher part called head (or base) and the lower part referred to as neck.

== Examples ==
A typical example of a funnel chart starts with the sales leads on top, then down to the qualified leads, the hot leads and the closed deals. A business is bound to lose some number of potential deals at each step in the sales process and this is represented by the narrowing sections as you move from the top section (the widest) to the bottom section (the narrowest.) This allows executives to see how effective the sales team is in turning a sales lead into a closed deal. A sales funnel chart can also be used to quickly communicate your organization's sales process to new members of the sales team or other interested parties.

A funnel chart can be used to display Web site visitor trends. It is likely that the funnel chart will display a wide area at the top, indicating visitor page hits to the homepage, and the other areas will be proportionally smaller, like the downloads or the people interested in buying the product.

Another example is the order fulfillment funnel chart with the initiated orders on top and down to the bottom the orders delivered to satisfied customers. It shows how many there are still in the process and the percentage cancelled and returned.

== Purpose of chart ==
Ideally the funnel chart shows a process that starts at 100% and ends with a lower percentage where it is noticeable in what stages the decrease happens and at what rate. If the chart is also combined with research data, meaning quantified measurements of just how many items are lost at each step of the sales or order fulfillment process, then the funnel chart illustrates where the biggest bottlenecks are in the process.

Note that unlike a real funnel, everything that is "poured in" at the top doesn't flow through to the bottom. The name only refers to the shape of the chart, the purpose of which is illustrative.

== See also ==
- Exploratory data analysis
- Information graphics
- Graphic organizer
- Mathematical diagram
- Plot (graphics)
