= Jan-Christoph Borchardt =

German open source designer (born 1989)

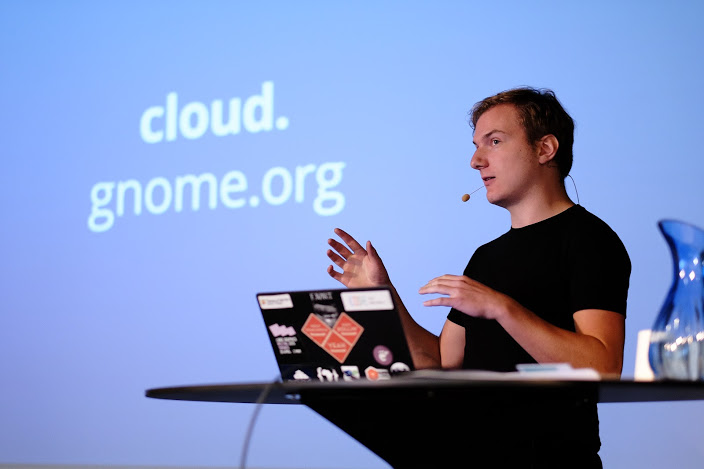
- Jan-Christoph Borchardt at GUADEC 2015
- Born: 3 May 1989 (age 37); Minden, Germany
- Occupation: open source designer
- Known for: ownCloud, Nextcloud, Terms of Service; Didn't Read
- Website: jancborchardt.net

Jan-Christoph Borchardt (born 3 May 1989 in Minden, Germany) is a German open source interaction designer. He is primarily known for his work on Open Source Design, Terms of Service; Didn't Read, ownCloud, and now Nextcloud.

== Open Source Design ==
In his bachelor thesis "Usability in Free Software" he argues that "For a software to truly be free, people need to be able to easily use it without help". His thesis has the subtitle "Freedom 4: The freedom to use the program effectively, efficiently and satisfactorily", a reference to the four freedoms of free software.

He is a cofounder of Open Source Design, "a community of designers and developers pushing more open design processes and improving the user experience and interface design of open source software". To that effect he has been responsible for the introduction of the “Open Source Design room” in 2015 at FOSDEM as well as FOSSASIA in 2016.

In 2013 he was a lecturer for Design in Open Source Software at the nationally recognised University of Design, Art and Media "Merz Akademie" in Stuttgart, Germany.

== Free software ==
Borchardt contributes to several open-source projects and communities. This includes Shotwell (software), Diaspora (social network), elementary OS as well as the Nextcloud and ownCloud projects.

In 2012 he co-founded Terms of Service; Didn't Read, a community project aiming to analyze and grade the terms of service and privacy policies of major internet sites and services. He is co-chair of the W3C Unhosted Web Community Group.

Based on his belief that contributing to open-source is already difficult enough he is also a cofounder of the Stuttgart JS and Tel Aviv JS meetups. As well as several other community events such as AfricaHackTrip.

== ownCloud and Nextcloud ==
Since early 2011 he has been the lead designer of ownCloud. As of 2016 after the fork of ownCloud into Nextcloud he is employed by Nextcloud as design lead.
