= Consolidation ratio =

Consolidation ratio within network infrastructure for Internet hosting, is the number of virtual servers that can run on each physical host machine. Many companies arrive at that figure through trial and error by stacking virtual machines on top of each other until performance slows to a crawl. “It’s sort of capacity planning by bloody nose,” observes Bob Gill, managing director of server research for analyst firm TheInfoPro Inc. of New York.

The recent V-index showed that the average consolidation ratio is actually lower than was expected - 6.3:1 VMs per physical host (actual ratio) vs. 9.8:1 (perceived)

== See also ==
- Nagle's algorithm
