= ContentTools =

ContentTools editor
- Developer: Anthony Blackshaw - Getme Limited
- Repository: github.com/GetmeUK/ContentTools
- Written in: JavaScript / CoffeeScript
- Type: HTML editor, text editor, WYSIWYG editor, Online rich-text editor
- License: MIT
- Website: getcontenttools.com

ContentTools is an open-source WYSIWYG editor for HTML content written in JavaScript/CoffeeScript by Anthony Blackshaw of Getme Limited.

The ContentTools editor allows text content, images, embedded videos, tables and other page content to be edited, resized, or moved via drag and drop directly within the page. The ContentTools editor features a floating context-sensitive toolbar which can be repositioned by the user and which offers functionality and ease of use similar to a word processing application.

The ContentTools editor is written in JavaScript / CoffeeScript, therefore it can easily be integrated with any HTML document, customised, extended or integrated into a full web-based content management system.

The ContentTools editor has already been implemented into the content management systems of a number of websites built by Getme Limited, as well as used within the third party systems Yii and Page Builder Sandwich.

== The ContentTools collection ==
ContentTools is part of a collection of JavaScript libraries (ContentTools, ContentEdit, ContentSelect, FSM, HTMLParser) which were developed to aid in the creation of HTML WYSIWYG editors.

== Browser compatibility ==
The ContentTools editor is compatible with all major web browsers and Operating Systems including Google Chrome, Internet Explorer, Mozilla Firefox, and Safari.

== Reception ==
Response to the release of ContentTools from the web development community has been positive. Raymond Camden of the Telerik Developer Network wrote in his review that, despite his previous dislike of rich text editors, he was "pretty impressed with ContentTools" and described the general ease of use as "really well done". Jake Rocheleau of Web Design Ledger said "the functionality is stellar and would be superb if combined with user authentication".

ContentTools was featured in Tutorialzine's 15 Interesting JavaScript and CSS Libraries for June 2016, where Danny Markov described ContentTools as "a powerful JavaScript library that can transform any HTML page into a WYSIWYG editor", adding "ContentTools reveals countless possibilities for building wondrous interactive apps and services."

ContentTools was also featured on Sitepoint's 10 Best jQuery and HTML5 WYSIWYG Plugins, JavaScripting.com's selection of the best JavaScript libraries, frameworks, and plugins, and Unheap's repository of javascript plugins. ContentTools has been recommended by WebdesignerDepot, Codrops, WebAppers, Speckyboy and BestDevList.

ContentTools was included in the 50+ Best CSS and JavaScript Libraries in 2016 by creatskills.com.

== Implementations ==
The ContentTools editor has been implemented into the following content management systems:

- Yii 2.0 via the implementation Yii 2.0: yii2-content-tools
- Page Builder Sandwich, a commercial page builder plugin for use with WordPress websites

== See also ==
- Aloha Editor
- CKEditor
- TinyMCE
