= Mongoose Play =

The Mongoose Play is a piece of folk theatre from Saint Kitts. The play is based around a battle against mongooses, who threatened the island's chickens, an important food source, after having been imported to exterminate the then-raging snake and rat population. The Mongoose Play involves both dance and music performed by costumed masqueraders.
