= Nodejitsu =

- Type: Subsidiary
- Founded: April 2010
- Founder: Charlie Robbins; Marak Squires; Paolo Fragomeni
- Headquarters: New York City, New York
- Key people: Charlie Robbins (CEO)
- Services: Platform as a service (PaaS)
- Parent: GoDaddy
- Website: nodejitsu.com

Nodejitsu Inc was a cloud platform as a service (PaaS). Nodejitsu was based on Node.js and serves Node.js applications on their platform. Nodejitsu's headquarters were in New York City, New York, with datacenters in the United States and Europe.

Nodejitsu announced in February 2015 that they have been acquired by GoDaddy and will be exiting the PaaS business.

== History ==
Nodejitsu was founded in April 2010 by Charlie Robbins, Marak Squires, and Paolo Fragomeni. Coined "the original Node.js platform as a service", Nodejitsu partnered with Joyent on April 2, 2012. Joyent took a shot at a Node.js platform as a service previously. As of November 7, 2012, Joyent no longer offers the No.de platform as a service, and instead recommends Nodejitsu.

On May 22, 2013, Nodejitsu acquired IrisCouch. The IrisCouch team has merged with the Nodejitsu team during this acquisition, introducing Jeff Jackson as the new chief operations officer and Jason Smith as the new chief technical officer. IrisCouch will also be blended into Nodejitsu's current platform to provide an all-in-one platform for deploying Node.js applications, as well as provisioning CouchDB and Redis databases. This also means that IrisNPM will be shut down and merged into Nodejitsu's platform. Nodejitsu will still be allowing private NPM repositories, but there is not a pricing model for these databases or NPM repositories yet.

On June 4 and 5, 2013, Nodejitsu was featured in The New York Times and TechCrunch for being one of the first companies that has been invested in by Bloomberg Beta, a new $75 million start-up investment fund headed by former IGN executive Roy Bahat. In February 2015, Nodejitsu announced that they have been acquired by GoDaddy and will be exiting the PaaS business.

== Open Source ==
Continuing with the Nodejitsu tradition of open source evangelism, Nodejitsu maintains numerous open-source projects in their Github repositories. On top of their open-source contributions, they also offer one free drone (server) to open-source applications as of January 31, 2013. Open-source applications must be able to provide a repository with the user's source code.

== Controversy ==
Sometime around December 2010, Nodejitsu was banned on Hacker News due to controversy following the actions of Marak Squires' alleged spamming of Hacker News and claims of Nodejitsu rallying users to increase votes on their posts. Charlie Robbins combated the ban, pointing out that users of Nodejitsu are given Nodejitsu subdomains for their applications. It is still a common occurrence, as with many other programming languages, that Nodejitsu users post their applications to Hacker News for public feedback. The ban on the Nodejitsu domain caused all users' posts containing a Nodejitsu domain to be removed. Nodejitsu's ban on Hacker News has been lifted since October 24, 2011, and was publicly announced on Hacker News by Paul Graham.

== See also ==
- Platform as a Service
