= ORBX.js =

JavaScript library codec

- Developers: Mozilla, OTOY
- Release: In development
- Written in: JavaScript, HTML5
- Operating system: Cross-platform
- Type: Codec

ORBX.js is a JavaScript library codec able to stream video in any HTML5-compliant browser. The project is a partnership between Mozilla and OTOY.

== See also ==
- PDF.js
