= PM2 (software) =

Node.js process manager

pm2
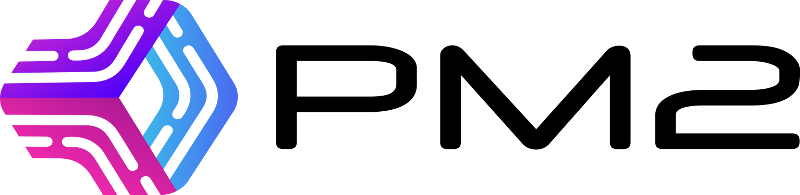

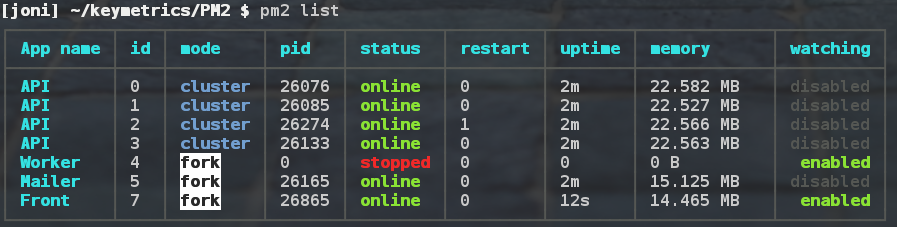
- Original author(s): Alexandre Strzelewicz
- Initial release: 27 June 2013; 11 years ago
- Stable release: 5.3.1 / 20 January 2024; 14 months ago
- Repository: github.com/unitech/pm2
- Written in: JavaScript
- Platform: Linux/Unix/Windows
- Licence: AGPLv3
- Website: github.com/Unitech/pm2

PM2 is a process manager for the JavaScript runtime Node.js.

== Overview ==
PM2 or Process Manager 2, is an Open Source, production ready Node.js process manager. Some key features of PM2 are automatic application load balancing, declarative application configuration, deployment system and monitoring.

Started in 2013 by Alexandre Strzelewicz. The code source is hosted on GitHub and installable via npm.
