= Mongoose (MongoDB) =

JavaScript library for working with MongoDB

- Stable release: 8.3.4
- Repository: github.com/Automattic/mongoose
- Written in: JavaScript
- Type: Web server
- License: MIT
- Website: mongoosejs.com

Mongoose is a JavaScript object-oriented programming library that creates a connection between MongoDB and the Node.js JavaScript runtime environment. It provides a straightforward, schema-based solution to model application data. Mongoose includes built-in type casting, validation, query building, business logic hooks, and more, out of the box.

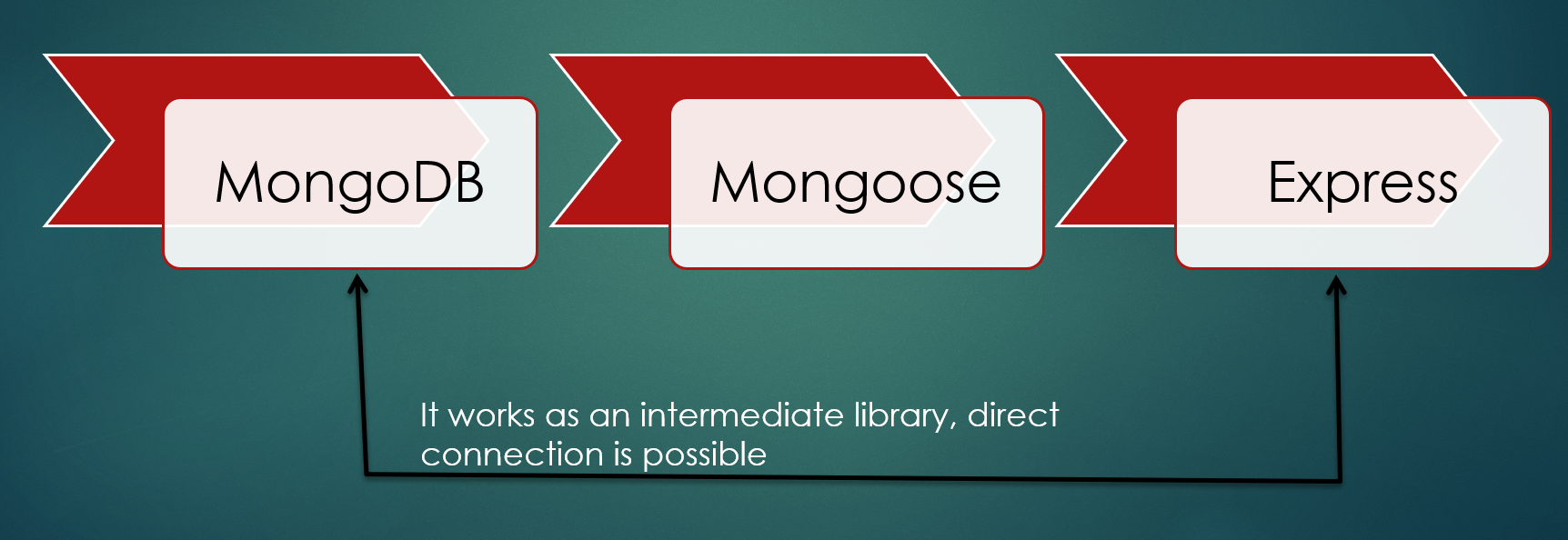
Mongoose as an intermediate library between MongoDB and Express
