= Plotly =

Canadian computing company

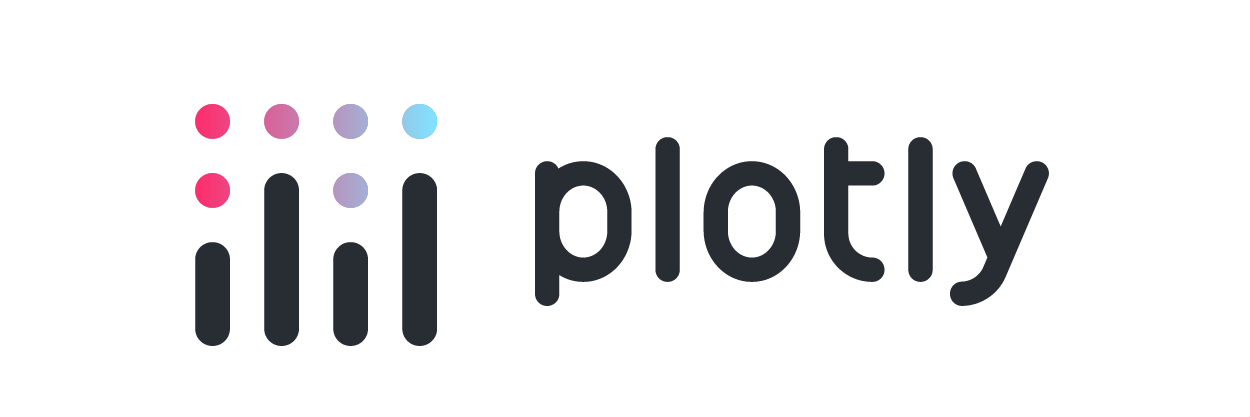
- Company type: Private
- Industry: Computer software
- Founded: 2012; 14 years ago in Montreal, Quebec
- Founder: Alex Johnson; Jack Parmer; Chris Parmer; Matthew Sundquist
- Headquarters: Canada
- Website: plotly.com

Plotly is a technical computing company headquartered in Montreal, Quebec, that develops online data analytics and visualization tools. Plotly provides online graphing, analytics, and statistics tools for individuals and collaboration, as well as scientific graphing libraries for Python, R, MATLAB, Perl, Julia, Arduino, JavaScript and REST.

== History ==
Plotly was founded by Alex Johnson, Jack Parmer, Chris Parmer, and Matthew Sundquist.

The founders' backgrounds are in science, energy, and data analysis and visualization. Early employees include Christophe Viau, a Canadian software engineer and Ben Postlethwaite, a Canadian geophysicist. Plotly was named one of the Top 20 Hottest Innovative Companies in Canada by the Canadian Innovation Exchange. Plotly was featured in "startup row" at PyCon 2013, and sponsored the SciPy 2018 conference.

Plotly raised $5.5 million during its Series A funding, led by MHS Capital, Siemens Venture Capital, Rho Ventures, Real Ventures, and Silicon Valley Bank.

The Boston Globe and Washington Post newsrooms have produced data journalism using Plotly. In 2020, Plotly was named a Best Place to Work by the Canadian SME National Business Awards, and nominated as Business of the Year.

== Products ==
Plotly offers open-source and enterprise products.

- Dash is an open-source Python, R, and Julia framework for building web-based analytic applications. Many specialized open-source Dash libraries exist that are tailored for building domain-specific Dash components and applications. Some examples are Dash DAQ, for building data acquisition GUIs to use with scientific instruments, and Dash Bio, which enables users to build custom chart types, sequence analysis tools, and 3D rendering tools for bioinformatics applications.
- Dash Enterprise is Plotly's paid product for building, testing, deploying, managing and scaling Dash applications organization-wide.
- Chart Studio Cloud is a free, online tool for creating interactive graphs. It has a point-and-click graphical user interface for importing and analyzing data into a grid and using stats tools. Graphs can be embedded or downloaded.
- Chart Studio Enterprise is a paid product that allows teams to create, style, and share interactive graphs on a single platform. It offers expanded authentication and file export options, and does not limit sharing and viewing.
- Data visualization libraries Plotly.js is an open-source JavaScript library for creating graphs and powers Plotly.py for Python, as well as Plotly.R for R, MATLAB, Node.js, Julia, and Arduino and a REST API. Plotly can also be used to style interactive graphs with Jupyter notebook.
- Figure converters which convert matplotlib, ggplot2, and IGOR Pro graphs into interactive, online graphs.

A gallery of Plotly graphs

== Data visualization libraries ==
Plotly provides a collection of supported chart types across several programming languages:

Chart Type	Chart name	JavaScript	Python	R	Julia
Basic charts	Scatter plot	checked box	checked box	checked box	checked box
Basic charts	Line chart	checked box	checked box	checked box	checked box
Basic charts	Bar chart	checked box	checked box	checked box	checked box
Basic charts	Pie chart	checked box	checked box	checked box	checked box
Basic charts	Bubble chart	checked box	checked box	checked box	checked box
Basic charts	Dot plot	checked box	checked box	checked box	checked box
Basic charts	Filled area plot	checked box	checked box	checked box	checked box
Basic charts	Horizontal bar chart	checked box	checked box	checked box	checked box
Basic charts	Gantt chart	unchecked box	checked box	checked box	unchecked box
Basic charts	Sunburst chart	checked box	checked box	checked box	checked box
Basic charts	Sankey diagram	checked box	checked box	checked box	checked box
Basic charts	Point cloud	checked box	unchecked box	unchecked box	checked box
Basic charts	Treemap	checked box	checked box	checked box	checked box
Basic charts	Table	checked box	checked box	checked box	checked box
Basic charts	Dumbbell plot	unchecked box	checked box	checked box	unchecked box
AI and machine learning charts	ML regression	unchecked box	checked box	unchecked box	unchecked box
AI and machine learning charts	kNN classification	unchecked box	checked box	unchecked box	unchecked box
AI and machine learning charts	ROC and PR curves	unchecked box	checked box	unchecked box	unchecked box
AI and machine learning charts	PCA visualization	unchecked box	checked box	unchecked box	unchecked box
AI and machine learning charts	t-SNE and UMAP projections	unchecked box	checked box	unchecked box	unchecked box
Statistical charts	Box plot	checked box	checked box	checked box	checked box
Statistical charts	Histogram	checked box	checked box	checked box	checked box
Statistical charts	Distplot	unchecked box	checked box	unchecked box	unchecked box
Statistical charts	2D density plot	checked box	unchecked box	unchecked box	checked box
Statistical charts	2D histogram	checked box	checked box	checked box	checked box
Statistical charts	2D histogram contour	checked box	checked box	checked box	checked box
Statistical charts	Scatterplot matrix	unchecked box	checked box	unchecked box	unchecked box
Statistical charts	Facet and trellis plot	unchecked box	checked box	unchecked box	unchecked box
Statistical charts	Tree plot	unchecked box	checked box	unchecked box	unchecked box
Statistical charts	SPC control chart	checked box	unchecked box	unchecked box	checked box
Statistical charts	Violin plot	checked box	checked box	checked box	checked box
Statistical charts	Parallel categories diagram	checked box	checked box	unchecked box	checked box
Statistical charts	Splom	checked box	unchecked box	checked box	checked box
Statistical charts	Marginal distribution plot	unchecked box	checked box	unchecked box	unchecked box
Statistical charts	Strip chart	unchecked box	checked box	unchecked box	unchecked box
Scientific charts	Contour plot	checked box	checked box	checked box	checked box
Scientific charts	Heatmap	checked box	checked box	checked box	checked box
Scientific charts	Imshow	unchecked box	checked box	unchecked box	unchecked box
Scientific charts	Ternary plot	checked box	checked box	checked box	checked box
Scientific charts	Parallel coordinates plot	checked box	checked box	checked box	checked box
Scientific charts	Log plot	checked box	checked box	checked box	checked box
Scientific charts	Dendrogram	unchecked box	checked box	unchecked box	unchecked box
Scientific charts	Annotated heatmap	unchecked box	checked box	unchecked box	unchecked box
Scientific charts	WebGL heatmap	checked box	unchecked box	checked box	checked box
Scientific charts	Wind rose chart	checked box	checked box	unchecked box	checked box
Scientific charts	Ternary contour plot	checked box	checked box	checked box	checked box
Scientific charts	Ternary overlay	unchecked box	checked box	unchecked box	unchecked box
Scientific charts	Quiver plot	unchecked box	checked box	unchecked box	unchecked box
Scientific charts	Streamline plot	unchecked box	checked box	unchecked box	unchecked box
Scientific charts	Network graph	unchecked box	checked box	checked box	unchecked box
Scientific charts	Radar chart	checked box	checked box	checked box	checked box
Scientific charts	Carpet plot	checked box	checked box	checked box	checked box
Scientific charts	Carpet scatter plot	checked box	checked box	checked box	checked box
Scientific charts	Carpet contour plot	checked box	checked box	checked box	checked box
Scientific charts	Polar chart	checked box	checked box	checked box	checked box
Scientific charts	Image data display	checked box	unchecked box	checked box	checked box
Financial charts	Waterfall chart	checked box	checked box	checked box	checked box
Financial charts	Indicator	checked box	checked box	unchecked box	checked box
Financial charts	Candlestick chart	checked box	checked box	checked box	checked box
Financial charts	Funnel chart	checked box	checked box	checked box	checked box
Financial charts	Time series	checked box	checked box	checked box	checked box
Financial charts	OHLC chart	checked box	checked box	checked box	checked box
Financial charts	Gauge chart	checked box	checked box	checked box	checked box
Financial charts	Bullet chart	checked box	checked box	checked box	checked box
Maps	Mapbox map layers	checked box	checked box	checked box	checked box
Maps	Mapbox density heatmap	checked box	checked box	checked box	checked box
Maps	Mapbox choropleth map	checked box	checked box	checked box	checked box
Maps	Choropleth map	checked box	checked box	checked box	checked box
Maps	Lines on maps	checked box	checked box	checked box	checked box
Maps	Lines on Mapbox	unchecked box	checked box	checked box	unchecked box
Maps	Bubble maps	checked box	checked box	checked box	checked box
Maps	Scatter plots on maps	checked box	checked box	checked box	checked box
Maps	Scatter plots on Mapbox	checked box	checked box	checked box	checked box
Maps	Filled area on map	checked box	checked box	checked box	checked box
Maps	Mapbox hexbin	unchecked box	checked box	unchecked box	unchecked box
3D charts	3D scatter plot	checked box	checked box	checked box	checked box
3D charts	Ribbon plot	checked box	unchecked box	unchecked box	checked box
3D charts	3D surface plot	checked box	checked box	checked box	checked box
3D charts	3D mesh plot	checked box	checked box	checked box	checked box
3D charts	3D line plot	checked box	checked box	checked box	checked box
3D charts	Tri-surf plot	checked box	checked box	checked box	checked box
3D charts	3D cluster graph	checked box	unchecked box	unchecked box	checked box
3D charts	3D cone plot	checked box	checked box	checked box	checked box
3D charts	3D streamtube plot	checked box	checked box	checked box	checked box
3D charts	3D isosurface plot	checked box	checked box	checked box	checked box
3D charts	3D bubble chart	unchecked box	checked box	unchecked box	unchecked box
3D charts	3D volume plot	unchecked box	checked box	unchecked box	unchecked box
Subplots	Subplots	checked box	checked box	checked box	checked box
Multiple Axes	Multiple Axes	checked box	checked box	checked box	checked box

== Dash ==
Dash is a Python framework built on top of React, a JavaScript library. Dash also works for R, and most recently supports Julia. While still described as a Python framework, Python isn't used for the other languages: "... describing Dash as a Python framework misses a key feature of its design: the Python side (the back end/server) of Dash was built to be lightweight and stateless [allowing] multiple back-end languages to coexist on an equal footing".

It is possible to integrate D3.js charts as Dash components. Dash provides the default CSS (plus HTML and JavaScript), but for custom styling Dash applications, CSS can be added, or Dash Enterprise used.

=== Dash Enterprise ===
Dash Enterprise is Plotly's paid product for building, testing, deploying, managing and scaling Dash applications organization-wide. The product integrates with enterprise IT systems to enable organizations to build, deploy and scale low-code Dash applications. With open-source Dash, analytic applications can be run from a local machine, but cannot be easily accessed by others in the organization.

==== Enterprise IT integration ====
Dash Enterprise installs on cloud environments and on-premises. Amazon Web Services, Google Cloud Platform, and Microsoft Azure are supported, as are multiple Linux on-premises servers. Authentication integrations include LDAP, AD, PKI, Okta, SAML, OAuth2, SSO, and email authentication, and Dash application access is managed through a GUI rather than code. Dash Enterprise connects to major big data backends, including Salesforce, PostgreSQL, Databricks via PySpark, Snowflake, Dask, Datashader, and Vaex. In 2020, Plotly partnered with NVIDIA to integrate Dash with RAPIDS, and NVIDIA participated in Plotly's Series C funding round.

==== Low-code capabilities ====
Dash Enterprise enables low-code development of Dash applications, which is not possible with open-source Dash. Enterprise users can write applications in multiple development environments, including Jupyter Notebook. Dash Enterprise ships with several “development engines” for drag-and-drop application editing, application design, and automated reporting, as well as dozens of artificial intelligence and machine learning application templates.

==== Deployment and scaling ====
Dash application code is deployed to Dash Enterprise using the git-push command. Dash application deployments are containerized to avoid dependency conflicts, and can be embedded in existing web platforms without iframes. Deployed applications can be managed and accessed in a single portal called App Manager, where administrators can control user authentication and view usage analytics. Dash Enterprise scales horizontally with Kubernetes. Jobs queuing, GPU acceleration, and CPU parallelization support high performance computing requirements. Plotly also offers professional services for application development and workshop training.
