= Mozilla Raindrop =

Messaging application

- Developer: Mozilla Corporation / Mozilla Foundation
- Operating system: Cross-platform
- License: Mozilla Public License 1.1
- Website: http://labs.mozilla.com/raindrop (inactive)

Raindrop was a messaging application building on Apache's CouchDB which was used through a web interface. Raindrop worked by collecting emails and tweets and storing them as JSON optionally with attachments in CouchDB, then serving them to users with CouchDB's webserver so users can view them in their web browsers. By December 2009 there was a prototype for testers but no official stable release.

Raindrop was an exploration in messaging innovation being led by the team responsible for Thunderbird,

Raindrop was introduced by the Mozilla Foundation on October 22, 2009.

As of May 2012, the Mozilla Raindrop project is considered inactive. The website is no longer present.
