= Popcorn.js =

Open-source JavaScript library for HTML5 media developers

Popcorn.js is an open source JavaScript library for HTML5 media developers, freely available under the MIT License. It uses the native HTMLMediaElement properties, methods and events, normalizes them into an API, and provides a plugin system. Extensible support for playing non-native media (ex: YouTube, Vimeo, SoundCloud) is available through the normalized API via wrappers. Popcorn.js is part of a Mozilla program to promote Web video creation via open standards, and though outside Web development communities, has been named by sources such as Wired.com as one of technologies with the greatest potential in the future of video online.

== History ==
Popcorn.js was developed by Mozilla in collaboration with Seneca College's Centre for Development of Open Technology (CDOT), which contributed development work and player plugins to the project. The library grew out of Mozilla's broader Popcorn project, which aimed to make browser-based video "hackable, linkable, remixable, and connected" to the rest of the open web.

Built on top of Popcorn.js, Mozilla released Popcorn Maker (originally prototyped under the name "Butter"), a browser-based visual authoring tool that let non-programmers combine HTML5 video with images, text, maps, and other web content on a timeline without writing code. Popcorn Maker was used to produce interactive productions such as the National Film Board of Canada's One Millionth Tower and PBS/NPR's 2012 U.S. election coverage.

== Discontinuation ==
In August 2015, Mozilla announced it would stop supporting Popcorn Maker (along with a related tool, Appmaker) to focus development resources on other Webmaker tools such as Thimble, with the tools becoming inaccessible after September 30, 2015, though their source code would remain available. The Popcorn Maker source repository was later archived on GitHub and marked "RETIRED". The core Popcorn.js library itself was subsequently marked as unmaintained by Mozilla, with its GitHub repository stating "Mozilla no longer maintains this project" and pointing users to community forks for continued development.
