= Google Charts =

Interactive Web service

- Original author(s): Google
- Website: developers.google.com/chart

Google Charts is an online tool that is used to create charts and graphs. It uses HTML5 and SVG to function on multiple browsers and devices without extra plugins or software. It is known for its wide range of chart options and features, which are explained on the official Google Charts website.

Since its launch in May 2007, Google Charts has received regular updates to include new features. As of March 2023, Google Charts has been updated to version 54. The Google Charts Release Notes page provides a comprehensive list of all updates and changes made.

Google Charts is notable for its use in education. The NCBI article titled "Teaching Data Science to Medical Students: A Multi-Disciplinary Approach" (NCBI article) covered how Google Charts has helped medical students learn about data science in a hands-on way. Google Charts allows for the visualization of complex data sets, which may improve some students' understanding of the information.

Google Charts can be used to create real-time dashboards for monitoring and reporting data, which may be useful in some career fields. Another article from the NCBI, "Using Google Charts API to Generate a Real-Time Report Dashboard" (NCBI article), demonstrated this feature's integration in healthcare and research.

== See also ==
- JavaScript framework
- JavaScript library
