= Chart.js =

Free open-source JavaScript library for data visualization

- Original author: Nick Downie
- Developers: Chart.js Team and contributors
- Stable release: 4.5.1 / 13 October 2025; 12 months ago
- Written in: JavaScript
- Type: JavaScript library
- License: MIT
- Website: www.chartjs.org
- Repository: github.com/chartjs/Chart.js

Chart.js is a free, open-source JavaScript library for data visualization, which supports eight chart types: bar, line, area, pie (doughnut), bubble, radar, polar, and scatter. Created by London-based web developer Nick Downie in 2013, now it is maintained by the community and is the second most popular JavaScript charting library on GitHub by the number of stars after D3.js, considered significantly easier to use though less customizable than the latter. Chart.js renders in HTML5 canvas and is widely covered as one of the best data visualization libraries. It is available under the MIT license.

== History ==
Chart.js has had four major version releases as detailed below.

Version	Release date	Key contributors	Key features
1.0.1	Jan 7, 2015	Nick Downie	Initial release
2.0.0	Apr 9, 2016	Evert Timberg, Tanner Linsley	Expanded animations; time scale; bubble, scatter, and stacked charts
3.0.0	Apr 2, 2021	Jukka Kurkela, Evert Timberg, Ben McCann, Simon Brunel	Major performance improvements, scriptable options, rewritten animation system, new documentation
4.0.0	Nov 14, 2022	Jacco van den Berg, Jukka Kurkela, Evert Timberg	ESM-only packaging

== See also ==
- JavaScript framework
- JavaScript library
- Open-source software
