= Sputnik (JavaScript conformance test) =

Conformity test for JavaScript implementations

- Owner: Google Inc.
- Creators: Christian Plesner Hansen, Sandholm
- Website: https://v8.github.io/test262/website/default.html
- Commercial: No
- Registration: No
- Launched: 29 June 2009
- Current status: active (version 1234)
- Content license: New BSD License

Sputnik was a JavaScript conformance test suite. The purpose of the test suite was to determine how well a JavaScript implementation adheres to the ECMA-262 specification, 5th edition, looking only at those features that were also present in the 3rd edition. It contained over 5000 tests that touched all aspects of the JavaScript language.

The test was created in Russia for testing the conformance of the V8 JavaScript engine used in Google Chrome.

As part of phasing out Google Labs, Google has shut down Sputnik. All current Sputnik tests have been incorporated into ECMA's Test262 test suite.

== Browsers that do not pass ==
As an example of a browser that does not pass, Konqueror 4.10.1 still only passes 91.8% of the 11573 tests.

=== Desktop browsers ===
Scores represent the number of failed tests – a perfect score is 0 (100%).

Desktop browser results in Sputnik
Browser name	Score of current release	Score of preview release
Internet Explorer	Internet Explorer 11.0.9600.17420 8/16436 (99.95%)	Internet Explorer 11.0.9879.0 3/16436 (99.98%)
Google Chrome	Google Chrome 30.0.1599.66 9/16436 (99.95%)	Google Chrome 32.0.1700.39 10/16436 (99.94%)
Safari	Safari 6.0.2 8/16436 (99.95%)	No preview results available
Mozilla Firefox	Firefox 33.1.1 53/16436 (99.68%)	Firefox 68.0a1 240/16436 (98.54%)
Opera	Opera 11.60 (build 1185) 1/16436 (99.99%)	Opera 12.00 (build 1191) 1/16436 (99.99%)

=== ECMAScript testsuite ===
Google has handed the tests from Sputnik test suite to Ecma International for inclusion in its ECMAScript 262 test suite. Some Sputnik tests however have been found to have issues and do not conform to ECMAScript 5th edition specification.

=== Mobile browsers ===
Mobile browsers
Browser name	Score of current release	Score of preview release
Android	128/16436 (99.22%)	no preview version
Safari (iOS 6.0.2)	30/16436 (99.82%)	no preview version
Internet Explorer Mobile	Internet Explorer Mobile 7 477/16436 (97.1%)	Internet Explorer Mobile 9 (SDK emulator) 88/16436 (99.46%)

== See also ==
- Acid3
