= JerryScript =

Lightweight JavaScript engine

- Developers: Samsung OSG, University of Szeged
- Repository: github.com/jerryscript-project/jerryscript
- Written in: C
- Type: JavaScript engine
- License: Apache 2.0
- Website: jerryscript.net

JerryScript is an ultra-lightweight JavaScript engine for the Internet of things. It is capable of executing ECMAScript 5.1 source code on devices with less than 64 KB of memory.

The engine was open sourced on GitHub in June 2015. JerryScript is licensed under the Apache License 2.0. In October 2016 the JS Foundation was formed and JerryScript is one of the initial projects.

== Key characteristics of JerryScript ==
- Full ECMAScript 5.1 standard compliance
- 170K binary size when compiled for ARM Thumb-2
- Heavily optimized for low memory consumption
- Written in C99 for maximum portability
- Snapshot support for precompiling JavaScript source code to byte code
- Mature C API, easy to embed in applications
  - Projects such as IoT.js are built on top of JerryScript

== Support ==
- Microcontrolers: STM32F4 ESP8266
