= ECMAScript for XML =

JavaScript extension to support XML

ECMAScript for XML (E4X) was an extension to ECMAScript (which includes ActionScript, JavaScript, and JScript) to add native support for Extensible Markup Language (XML). The goal was to provide a simpler alternative to the Document Object Model (DOM) interface for accessing XML documents. E4X added XML as a primitive data structure to allow faster and easier access to XML manipulation and better support within the language.

E4X was standardized by Ecma International in the ECMA-357 standard. The first edition was published in June 2004 and the second edition in December 2005. However, the E4X standard was deprecated by the Mozilla Foundation in 2014, and it was withdrawn by ISO/IEC in 2021.

The first implementation of E4X was designed by Terry Lucas and John Schneider and appeared in BEA's Weblogic Workshop 7.0, released in February 2003. BEA's implementation was based on Rhino and released before the ECMAScript E4X spec was completed in June 2004.

== Browser support ==
E4X was supported by SpiderMonkey (used in Firefox and Thunderbird). However, E4X was deprecated in Firefox 10 and eventually removed in Firefox 21.

E4X was supported by the OpenOffice.org software suite.

== Example ==
let sales = <sales vendor="John">
    <item type="peas" price="4" quantity="6"/>
    <item type="carrot" price="3" quantity="10"/>
    <item type="chips" price="5" quantity="3"/>
</sales>;

alert(sales.item.(@type == "carrot").@quantity);
alert(sales.@vendor);
for each(let price in sales..@price) {
    alert(price);
}
delete sales.item[0];
sales.item += <item type="oranges" price="4"/>;
sales.item.(@type == "oranges").@quantity = 4;

== See also ==
- JavaScript XML (JSX) – an XML based markup specifically for DOM manipulation
