= Spider monkey (disambiguation) =

Spidermonkey may refer to:

- Spider monkey, tropical forest animals of Central and South America
- SpiderMonkey, a JavaScript engine
- Spidermonkey, a character in Ben 10
- Jake Spidermonkey, a character in My Gym Partner's a Monkey
