= JSSP =

JSSP may refer to:

- Job-shop scheduling problem, an optimization problem in computer science
- JS Saint-Pierroise, a French football club
- JSSP, in the List of server-side JavaScript implementations
