= Kinoma =

Software engineering group specializing in ECMAScript for IoT

- Type: Private
- Industry: Software engineering
- Founded: (2002)
- Headquarters: Palo Alto, California, United States
- Number of employees: 15 (2008)
- Website: kinoma.com/

Kinoma, a division of Marvell Semiconductor, is a software engineering group providing an open-source, cross-platform ECMAScript stack aimed at developing software for Internet of Things products and other embedded devices. Additionally, Kinoma provides Kinoma Create, a hardware prototyping platform aimed at the independent maker community.

Kinoma initially offered consumer media players for the Palm OS Treo lineup. It expanded its offering starting in 2008 with Windows Mobile 6 and Symbian S60 devices, and in 2012 offered Kinoma Play for Android. Additionally, Kinoma licenses its core technologies for embedded/OEM products including Sling Media, Sprint Mobile TV, and Sony among others.

== Kinoma Player for Palm ==
Kinoma Player was offered as a default media player in Palm Treo–based devices.

Kinoma Player 4 EX was also sold as a premium media player on Palm OS–based phones until August 2010, which featured Kinoma Guide and YouTube video search. Kinoma Player 4 EX was sold until August 2010, and reached its support end-of-life on October 1, 2010.

== Kinoma Play ==
Kinoma Play, introduced at Mobile World Congress 2011 and released on March 13, 2012, was a combination media player, media browser, and app platform. The default app in Kinoma Play, Kinoma Guide, contained mobile-specific content from a variety of sources on the Internet. Kinoma Play also had downloadable apps to extend its capabilities, such as Box.net, ORB, ShoutCAST, as well as social media clients for Twitter, Facebook, and Foursquare among others. Kinoma Play featured "dashboards" that aggregated search results from any installed Kinoma Play apps in one screen.

=== Windows Mobile 6.X/Symbian S60 – 2008–2012 ===
Kinoma Play was introduced for Windows Mobile 6.0 devices on August 25, 2008, for $29.95, with Kinoma FreePlay available to users as a demo of the Kinoma Guide. Kinoma Play was eventually made available on Symbian S60 phones on September 15, 2009. No version of Kinoma was made for successive platforms from either Microsoft or Symbian. On March 12, 2012, after announcing Android general availability, Kinoma removed their online store to pay for the app on Windows Mobile and Symbian.

On April 1, 2012, all Windows Mobile and Symbian Kinoma products were discontinued.

=== Android – 2012–2014 ===
In February 2011, shortly after being acquired by Marvell, Kinoma announced an Android platform beta of their Kinoma Play app. On March 12, 2012, Kinoma released a preview copy of Kinoma Play for Android to the public, which was offered free of charge, also announcing that the final version of the app will also be offered free of charge. On January 6, 2014, Kinoma announced the discontinuation of availability and support for the app.

== Kinoma Connect ==
Kinoma Connect, introduced at CES 2014, is an app for Android and iOS designed to stream media and podcasts from a handheld device or tablet to DLNA-equipped devices such as smart TVs and Blu-ray players.

== Kinoma Create ==
On March 10, 2014, Kinoma introduced Kinoma Create, a "JavaScript-powered Internet of Things construction kit" via an Indiegogo campaign that achieved over five times its funding goal. It is positioned to provide JavaScript developers a more accessible way to demo and prototype internet-connected devices.

== KinomaJS ==
KinomaJS is a solution stack featuring an ECMAScript 6 virtual machine (XS), a development framework, an abstraction layer providing platform/OS independence, and other utilities, functions and extensions.

On March 1, 2015, KinomaJS was posted on GitHub as open-source under Apache License 2.0.

On January 5, 2016, San Diego–based AstroPrint demonstrated a prototype 3D Printer in partnership with KinomaJS at CES 2016. The project was a fully functional, commercial example of the KinomaJS framework.

As of March 2018, KinomaJS repository on GitHub is unmaintained and succeeded by Moddable project.

== History ==
Kinoma was founded in 2002 by ex-Apple employees Peter Hoddie, Brian Friedkin, Michael Kellner, and Elizabeth Dykstra-Erickson to design and build mobile media products. All four founders worked together in Apple's QuickTime team.

On February 14, 2011, Marvell announced they had acquired Kinoma.

As of February 2019, the Kinoma website displays "Kinoma websites are no longer being supported." Peter Hoddie, Brian Friedkin and Michael Kellner are now listed as team members of Palo-Alto–based Internet-of-Things startup Moddable.
