= Rhino (JavaScript engine) =

JavaScript engine written in Java

- Original author: Norris Boyd
- Developers: 1997: Mozilla Foundation; 1998: Mozilla Corporation; Present: volunteers
- Stable release: 1.9.1 / February 15, 2026; 4 months ago
- Written in: Java, JavaScript
- Operating system: Cross-platform
- Platform: Java virtual machine
- Available in: English
- Type: JavaScript engine
- License: MPL 2.0
- Website: rhino.github.io
- Repository: github.com/mozilla/rhino

Rhino is a JavaScript engine to run the JavaScript programming language, but hosted on a Java virtual machine (JVM). Rhino is written fully in Java language and managed by the Mozilla Foundation as free and open-source software. It is separate from the SpiderMonkey engine, which is also developed by Mozilla, but written in the C++ language and used in the Firefox web browser.

== History ==
The Rhino project began at Netscape in 1997, when they planned to produce a version of Netscape Navigator web browser written fully in Java, which needed an implementation of JavaScript written in Java. When Netscape stopped work on Javagator, as it was called, the Rhino project was finished as a JavaScript engine. Since then, a couple of major companies (including Sun Microsystems) have licensed Rhino for use in their products and paid Netscape to do so, allowing work to continue on it.

Originally, Rhino compiled all JavaScript code to JVM bytecode in generated Java class files. This produced the best performance, often beating the C++ implementation of JavaScript run with just-in-time compilation (JIT), but suffered from two faults. First, compile time was long since generating bytecode and loading the generated classes was a resource-intensive process. Also, the implementation effectively leaked memory since most Java virtual machines (JVM) didn't collect unused classes or the strings that are interned as a result of loading a class file. (This changed in later Java versions.)

As a result, in the fall of 1998, Rhino added an interpreted mode. The classfile generation code was moved to an optional, dynamic loading package. Compiling is faster and when scripts are no longer in use they can be collected like any other Java object.

Rhino was released to Mozilla Foundation in April 1998. Originally Rhino classfile generation had been held back from release. However the licensors of Rhino agreed to release all of Rhino as free and open-source software, including class file generation. Since its release to open source, Rhino has found a variety of uses and an increasing number of people have contributed to the code. The project gets its name from the animal on the cover of the JavaScript book from O'Reilly Media. As of version 1.80 (January 2025), Rhino supports Java 11 and up, and supports many ECMAScript ES6/ES2015 features.

== Use ==
Rhino converts JavaScript scripts into classes. Rhino works in both compiled and interpreted mode. It is intended to be used in client or server side applications, hence there is no built-in support for the web browser objects that are commonly associated with JavaScript.

Rhino can be used as a debugger by using the Rhino command-line interface or shell. The JavaScript shell provides a simple way to run scripts in batch processing mode or in an Interactive computing environment for exploratory programming. It can be used in applications by embedding Rhino.

A slightly modified version of Rhino 1.6r2 comes bundled with the Sun Microsystems release of Java SE version 6, which was released in December 2006. This makes it easier to integrate JavaScript as part of Java programs and to access Java resources from JavaScript. Other implementations of Java 6 may differ.

== See also ==
- JavaScript engine
- List of ECMAScript engines
- Nashorn (JavaScript engine) – a now-deprecated successor to Rhino for the JVM, starting at Java 8
