= Nashorn (JavaScript engine) =

JavaScript engine developed in Java

- Developers: Oracle Corporation, OpenJDK Community
- Stable release: 15.7 / August 21, 2025; 6 months ago
- Written in: Java
- Operating system: Cross-platform
- Platform: Java Virtual Machine
- Type: JavaScript engine
- License: GPL with a linking exception
- Repository: github.com/openjdk/nashorn

Nashorn is a JavaScript engine developed in the Java programming language originally by Oracle and later by the OpenJDK Community. It relies on the support for dynamically typed languages on the Java Platform (JSR 292) (a concept first realized in the experimental Da Vinci Machine and a standard part of Java 7 and later.) Nashorn was included with Java 8 through JDK 14.

== History ==
The project was announced first at the JVM language summit in July 2011, and then confirmed at JavaOne in October 2011.

On November 21, 2012, Oracle formally announced the open sourcing of the Nashorn source on the OpenJDK repository. The project aim will be to allow embedding JavaScript in Java applications via JSR-223 and to develop standalone JavaScript applications. On December 21, 2012, Oracle announced Nashorn source was publicly released in the OpenJDK repository.

It provides a 100% support of ECMAScript 5.1. It was the first JavaScript implementation to achieve 100% pass rate on the ECMAScript 5.1 test suite.

With the release of Java 11, Nashorn was deprecated citing challenges to maintenance, and has been removed from JDK 15 onwards.

Nashorn development continues on GitHub as a standalone OpenJDK project and the separate release can be used in Java projects from Java 11 and up.

== Name ==
Nashorn [ˈnaːsˌhɔɐ̯n] ("nahss-horn") is the German translation of rhinoceros, a play on words on Rhino, the name of a JavaScript engine implemented in Java and provided by Mozilla Foundation. The latter gets its name from the animal on the cover of the JavaScript book from O'Reilly Media.

== Performance ==
According to Oracle benchmarks, Nashorn performance is several orders of magnitude faster than the alternative Rhino JavaScript engine.

== See also ==
- List of ECMAScript engines
- List of JVM languages
