= QtScript =

Scripting engine

QtScript is a scripting engine that has been part of the Qt cross-platform application framework since version 4.3.0. It was first deprecated as of Qt 5.5, then dropped as of Qt 6.5, and replaced by Qt Meta-object Language (QML).

The scripting language is based on the ECMAScript standard with a few extensions, such as QObject-style signal and slot connections. The library contains the engine, and a C++ application programming interface (API) for evaluating QtScript code and exposing custom QObject-derived C++ classes to QtScript.

The QtScript Binding Generator provides bindings for the Qt API to access directly from ECMAScript. QtScript and the binding generator are used for Amarok 2's scripting system.

The QtScript version as of Qt 4.7 in 2011 uses JavaScriptCore but was developed no further. The module was deprecated as of Qt 5.5 in April 2015.

== Qt Script for Applications (QSA) ==
An earlier and unrelated scripting engine, named Qt Script for Applications (QSA), was shipped by Trolltech as a separate Qt-based library, dual-licensed under GNU General Public License (GPL) and a commercial license.

With the release of QtScript, QSA has been deprecated and reached its end of life in 2008.
