= ECMAScript version history =

Versions of a JavaScript standard

ECMAScript is a JavaScript standard developed by Ecma International. Since 2015, major versions have been published every June.

ECMAScript 2025, the 16th and current version, was released in June 2025.

== Versions ==
Edition	Date published	Name	Changes from prior edition	Editor
1	June 1997		First edition based on JavaScript 1.1 as implemented in Netscape Navigator 3.0.	Guy L. Steele Jr.
2	June 1998		Editorial changes to keep the specification fully aligned with ISO/IEC 16262:1998.	Mike Cowlishaw
3	December 1999		Based on JavaScript 1.2 as implemented in Netscape Navigator 4.0. Added regular expressions, better string handling, new control statements, try/catch exception handling, tighter definition of errors, formatting for numeric output, and other enhancements	Mike Cowlishaw
4	Abandoned (last draft 30 June 2003)	ECMAScript 4 (ES4)	The 4th edition was abandoned due to political differences concerning language complexity. Many features proposed for the 4th edition have been completely dropped; some were incorporated into the sixth edition.	
5	December 2009	ECMAScript 5 (ES5)	Adds "strict mode", a subset intended to provide more thorough error checking and avoid error-prone constructs. Clarifies many ambiguities in the 3rd edition specification, and accommodates behavior of real-world implementations that differed consistently from that specification. Adds some new features, such as getters and setters, library support for JSON, and more complete reflection on object properties.	Pratap Lakshman, Allen Wirfs-Brock
5.1	June 2011		Changes to keep the specification fully aligned with ISO/IEC 16262:2011.	Pratap Lakshman, Allen Wirfs-Brock
6	June 2015	ECMAScript 2015 (ES2015)	See #6th edition – ECMAScript 2015	Allen Wirfs-Brock
7	June 2016	ECMAScript 2016 (ES2016)	See #7th edition – ECMAScript 2016	Brian Terlson
8	June 2017	ECMAScript 2017 (ES2017)	See #8th edition – ECMAScript 2017	Brian Terlson
9	June 2018	ECMAScript 2018 (ES2018)	See #9th edition – ECMAScript 2018	Brian Terlson
10	June 2019	ECMAScript 2019 (ES2019)	See #10th edition – ECMAScript 2019	Brian Terlson, Bradley Farias, Jordan Harband
11	June 2020	ECMAScript 2020 (ES2020)	See #11th edition – ECMAScript 2020	Jordan Harband, Kevin Smith
12	June 2021	ECMAScript 2021 (ES2021)	See #12th edition – ECMAScript 2021	Jordan Harband, Shu-yu Guo, Michael Ficarra, Kevin Gibbons
13	June 2022	ECMAScript 2022 (ES2022)	See #13th edition – ECMAScript 2022	Shu-yu Guo, Michael Ficarra, Kevin Gibbons
14	June 2023	ECMAScript 2023 (ES2023)	See #14th edition – ECMAScript 2023	Shu-yu Guo, Michael Ficarra, Kevin Gibbons
15	June 2024	ECMAScript 2024 (ES2024)	See #15th edition – ECMAScript 2024	Shu-yu Guo, Michael Ficarra, Kevin Gibbons
16	June 2025	ECMAScript 2025 (ES2025)	See #16th edition – ECMAScript 2025	Shu-yu Guo, Michael Ficarra, Kevin Gibbons
17	June 2026	ECMAScript 2026 (ES2026)	See #17th edition – ECMAScript 2026	Shu-yu Guo, Michael Ficarra, Kevin Gibbons
18	(pending)	ECMAScript 2027 (ES2027)	Pending, see features being considered: #ES.Next	(pending)

In June 2004, Ecma International published ECMA-357 standard, defining an extension to ECMAScript, known as ECMAScript for XML (E4X). Ecma also defined a "Compact Profile" for ECMAScript – known as ES-CP, or ECMA 327 – that was designed for resource-constrained devices, which was withdrawn in 2015.

=== 4th edition (abandoned) ===
The proposed 4th edition of ECMA-262 (ECMAScript 4 or ES4) would have been the first major update to ECMAScript since the 3rd edition was published in 1999. The specification (along with a reference implementation) was originally targeted for completion by October 2008. The first draft was dated February 1999. An overview of the language was released by the working group on 23 October 2007.

By August 2008, the ECMAScript 4th edition proposal had been scaled back into a project code named ECMAScript Harmony. Features under discussion for Harmony at the time included:

- classes,
- a module system,
- optional type annotations and static typing, probably using a structural type system,
- generators and iterators,
- destructuring assignment, and
- algebraic data types.

The intent of these features was partly to better support programming in the large, and to allow sacrificing some of the script's ability to be dynamic to improve performance. For example, Tamarin – the virtual machine for ActionScript, developed and open-sourced by Adobe – has just-in-time compilation (JIT) support for certain classes of scripts.

In addition to introducing new features, some ES3 bugs were proposed to be fixed in edition 4. These fixes and others, and support for JSON encoding/decoding, have been folded into the ECMAScript, 5th Edition specification.

Work started on Edition 4 after the ES-CP (Compact Profile) specification was completed, and continued for approximately 18 months where slow progress was made balancing the theory of Netscape's JavaScript 2 specification with the implementation experience of Microsoft's JScript .NET. After some time, the focus shifted to the ECMAScript for XML (E4X) standard. The update has not been without controversy. In late 2007, a debate between Brendan Eich, later the Mozilla Foundation's CTO, and Chris Wilson, Microsoft's platform architect for Internet Explorer, became public on a number of blogs. Wilson cautioned that because the proposed changes to ECMAScript made it backwards incompatible in some respects to earlier versions of the language, the update amounted to "breaking the Web", and that stakeholders who opposed the changes were being "hidden from view". Eich responded by stating that Wilson seemed to be "repeating falsehoods in blogs" and denied that there was attempt to suppress dissent and challenged critics to give specific examples of incompatibility. He pointed out that Microsoft Silverlight and Adobe AIR rely on C# and ActionScript 3 respectively, both of which are larger and more complex than ECMAScript Edition 3.

ECMAScript 4 introduces a strict typing system. For example, a function add() could look like the following:

function add(a: int, b: int): int {
    return a + b;
}

The following primitive types were defined:

- Boolean
- Null
- Number
- Object
- String
- byte
- decimal
- double
- int
- uint
- void

Variables could have the following modifiers:

- static: makes a variable a class variable
- prototype: adds a variable to the class prototype object, with a get/set accessor

Classes were given the following modifiers:

- dynamic: allows properties to be added to instances at runtime
- final: cannot be extended by other classes
- internal: visible only to references in the current package
- public: visible to references globally

Class constructors were declared with the function keyword (rather than constructor), and took the name of the class itself:

class X {
    private var value: int;

    public function X(i: int) {
        value = i;
    }
}

Getter and setter methods were also defined with the get and set keywords:

class X {
    private var _value: int;

    function get value(): int {
        return _value;
    }

    function set value(n: int): void {
        _value = n;
    }
}

var x: X = new X();
x.value = 10;

Functions could have the following modifiers:

- static: makes the function a trait of the class, rather than an instance (i.e. a static method)
- final: declares a function cannot be overriden
- override: overrides a method of the same name and signature
- native: declares a function to be "implementation-defined"

Interfaces were introduced, which, much like Java interfaces, define a contract between an instance and code that consumes it.

interface Greetings {
    function hello(): void;
    function goodMorning(): void;
}

class Greeter implements Greetings {
    public function hello(): void {
        print("Hello, world!");
    }

    public function goodMorning(): void {
        print("Good morning, world!");
    }
}

var greeter: Greetings = new Greeter();
greeter.hello();

ECMAScript 4 additionally introduced packages, which acted like packages in Java or namespaces in C++ and C#. In addition, an "unnamed package" basically acted as the global namespace, which was implicitly imported by all other packages (and given by package { /* ... */ }).

package org.wikipedia {
    public class Article extends WikiObject {
        // ...
    }
}

import org.wikipedia.*; // Adds all symbols from org.wikipedia into scope
import org.wiktionary.Language; // Adds type "org.wiktionary.Language" into scope

In this example, Article has a fully-qualified name of org.wikipedia.Article. While modern ECMAScript features modules, ECMAScript 4 packages behaved more like a global naming scheme, akin to those of Java.

Namespaces also existed as a separate feature from packages, and acted as a qualifier of the definition's name.

package org.wikipedia.examples {
    public namespace English;
    public namespace French;

    public class BilingualGreeter {
        English function hello(): void {
            console.log("Hello, world!");
        }

        French function hello(): void {
            console.log("Bonjour, le monde!");
        }
    }
}

import org.wikipedia.examples.BilingualGreeter;

var greeter: BilingualGreeter = new BilingualGreeter();
use namespace English; // add all English namespace identifiers into scope

greeter.hello(); // invokes English version
greeter.French::hello(); // invokes French version

=== 5th edition – ECMAScript 2009 ===
Yahoo, Microsoft, Google, and other 4th edition dissenters formed their own subcommittee to design a less ambitious update of ECMAScript 3, tentatively named ECMAScript 3.1. This edition would focus on security and library updates, with a large emphasis on compatibility. After the aforementioned public sparring, the ECMAScript 3.1 and ECMAScript 4 teams agreed on a compromise: the two editions would be worked on, in parallel, with coordination between the teams to ensure that ECMAScript 3.1 remains a strict subset of ECMAScript 4 in both semantics and syntax.

However, the differing philosophies in each team resulted in repeated breakages of the subset rule, and it remained doubtful that the ECMAScript 4 dissenters would ever support or implement ECMAScript 4 in the future. After over a year since the disagreement over the future of ECMAScript within the Ecma Technical Committee 39, the two teams reached a new compromise in July 2008: Brendan Eich announced that Ecma TC39 would focus work on the ECMAScript 3.1 (later renamed to ECMAScript, 5th Edition) project with full collaboration of all parties, and vendors would target at least two interoperable implementations by early 2009. In April 2009, Ecma TC39 published the "final" draft of the 5th edition and announced that testing of interoperable implementations was expected to be completed by mid-July. On 3 December 2009, ECMA-262 5th edition was published.

Additions include JSON, String.trim() to easily remove whitespaces surrounding a string (" example " to "example"), String.charAt() to return a single character from a given position in a string, and Array.isArray(). A comma after the final pair of values in an object (var example = { "property1":"value1", "property2":"value2", }) also no longer causes a syntax error.

=== 6th edition – ECMAScript 2015 ===
The 6th edition, ECMAScript 6 (ES6) and later renamed to ECMAScript 2015, was finalized in June 2015. This update adds significant new syntax for writing complex applications, including class declarations (class Foo { ... }), ES6 modules like import * as moduleName from "..."; export const Foo, but defines them semantically in the same terms as ECMAScript 5 strict mode. Other new features include iterators and for...of loops, Python-style generators, arrow function expression (() => {...}), let keyword for local declarations, const keyword for constant local declarations, binary data, typed arrays, new collections (maps, sets and WeakMap), promises, number and math enhancements, reflection, proxies (metaprogramming for virtual objects and wrappers) and template literals using backticks (`) for multi-line strings without escape characters. The complete list is extensive. As the first "ECMAScript Harmony" specification, it is also known as "ES6 Harmony".

=== 7th edition – ECMAScript 2016 ===
The 7th edition, or ECMAScript 2016, was finalized in June 2016. Its features include exponentiation operator ** for numbers, await, async keywords for asynchronous programming (as a preparation for ES2017), and the Array.prototype.includes function. The exponentiation operator is equivalent to Math.pow, but provides a simpler syntax similar to languages like Python, F#, Perl, and Ruby. async / await was hailed as an easier way to use promises and develop asynchronous code.

=== 8th edition – ECMAScript 2017 ===
The 8th edition, or ECMAScript 2017, was finalized in June 2017. Its features include the Object.values, Object.entries and Object.getOwnPropertyDescriptors functions for easy manipulation of Objects, async / await constructions that use generators and promises, and additional features for concurrency and atomics. It also includes String.prototype.padStart().

=== 9th edition – ECMAScript 2018 ===
The 9th edition, or ECMAScript 2018, was finalized in June 2018. New features include the spread operator and rest parameters (...) for object literals, asynchronous iteration, Promise.prototype.finally and additions to RegExp.

The spread operator allows for the easy copying of object properties, as shown below.

let object = {a: 1, b: 2}

let objectClone = Object.assign({}, object) // before ES2018
let objectClone = {...object} // ES2018 syntax

let otherObject = {c: 3, ...object}
console.log(otherObject) // -> {c: 3, a: 1, b: 2}

=== 10th edition – ECMAScript 2019 ===
The 10th edition, or ECMAScript 2019, was published in June 2019. Added features include, but are not limited to, Array.prototype.flat, Array.prototype.flatMap, changes to Array.sort, and Object.fromEntries.

Array.sort is now guaranteed to be stable, meaning that elements with equal sorting keys will not change relative order before and after the sort operation. Array.prototype.flat(depth=1) flattens an array to a specified depth, meaning that all subarray elements (up to the specified depth) are concatenated recursively.

Another notable change is that so-called catch binding became optional.

=== 11th edition – ECMAScript 2020 ===
The 11th edition, or ECMAScript 2020, was published in June 2020. In addition to new functions, this version introduces a BigInt primitive type for arbitrary-sized integers, the nullish coalescing operator, and the globalThis object.

BigInts are created either with the BigInt constructor or with the syntax 10n, where "n" is placed after the number literal. BigInts allow the representation and manipulation of integers beyond Number.MAX_SAFE_INTEGER, while Numbers are represented by a double-precision 64-bit IEEE 754 value. The built-in functions in Math are not compatible with BigInts; for example, exponentiation of BigInts must be done with the ** operator instead of Math.pow.

The nullish coalescing operator, ??, returns its right-hand side operand when its left-hand side is null or undefined. This contrasts with the || operator, which would return "string" for all "falsy" values, such as the ones below.

undefined ?? "string" // -> "string"
null ?? "string" // -> "string"
false ?? "string" // -> false
NaN ?? "string" // -> NaN

Optional chaining makes it possible to access the nested properties of an object without having an AND check at each level. An example is const zipcode = person?.address?.zipcode. If any of the properties are not present, zipcode will be undefined.

=== 12th edition – ECMAScript 2021 ===
The 12th edition, ECMAScript 2021, was published in June 2021. This version introduces the replaceAll method for strings; Promise.any, a promise combinator that short-circuits when an input value is fulfilled; AggregateError, a new error type to represent multiple errors at once; logical assignment operators (??=, &&=, ||=); WeakRef, for referring to a target object without preserving it from garbage collection, and FinalizationRegistry, to manage registration and unregistration of cleanup operations performed when target objects are garbage collected; separators for numeric literals (1_000); and Array.prototype.sort was made more precise, reducing the number of cases that result in an implementation-defined sort order.

=== 13th edition – ECMAScript 2022 ===
The 13th edition, ECMAScript 2022, was published in June 2022. This version introduces top-level await, allowing the keyword to be used at the top level of modules; new class elements: public and private instance fields, public and private static fields, private instance methods and accessors, and private static methods and accessors; static blocks inside classes, to perform per-class evaluation initialization; the #x in obj syntax, to test for presence of private fields on objects; regular expression match indices via the /d flag, which provides start and end indices for matched substrings; the cause property on Error objects, which can be used to record a causation chain in errors; the at method for Strings, Arrays, and TypedArrays, which allows relative indexing; and Object.hasOwn, a convenient alternative to Object.prototype.hasOwnProperty.

=== 14th edition – ECMAScript 2023 ===
The 14th edition, ECMAScript 2023, was published in June 2023. This version introduces the toSorted, toReversed, with, findLast, and findLastIndex methods on Array.prototype and TypedArray.prototype, as well as the toSpliced method on Array.prototype; added support for #! shebang comments at the beginning of files to better facilitate executable ECMAScript files; and allowed the use of most Symbols as keys in weak collections.

=== 15th edition – ECMAScript 2024 ===
The 15th edition, ECMAScript 2024, was published in June 2024. This version introduces the Object.groupBy and Map.groupBy static methods, Promise.withResolvers, various set operations on Set.prototype, and the /v unicode flag for regular expressions.

The Object.groupBy and Map.groupBy methods group an iterable collection using the return value of a provided callback function.

// sample data
const arr = [
    { year: "2024", id: 0 },
    { year: "2023", id: 1 },
    { year: "2024", id: 2 },
];

const obj = Object.groupBy(arr, (el) => el.year);
console.log(obj); 
// { "2024": [{ year: "2024", id: 0 }, { year: "2024", id: 2 }], "2023": [{ year: "2023", id: 1 }] }

Promise.withResolvers provides a simple way to get a promise's resolve and reject functions directly without having to assign them in the constructor.

// ES 2023
let resolve;
let reject;
let promise = new Promise((res, rej) => {
    resolve = res;
    reject = rej;
});

// ES 2024
const { resolve, reject, promise } = Promise.withResolvers();

The /v flag in regular expressions is simply an improved version of the /u flag, but as it makes backwards-incompatible changes it had to be introduced as a new flag.

=== 16th edition – ECMAScript 2025 ===
The 16th edition of ECMAScript released in 2025. It adds the following:

- The Iterator object which can wrap iterators like Array and provides a functional interface with lazy evaluation.
- Promise.try: call a method which may or may not be a promise as a promise
- New Set methods: Set.intersection, Set.difference, Set.symmetricDifference, Set.isSubsetOf, Set.isSupersetOf, Set.isDisjointFrom
- RegExp.escape function to escape a string so it can be concatenated together with a regex pattern.
- Duplicate named capturing groups allowed in regular expressions for different disjunction alternatives.
- Importing JSON files directly as modules
- Float16Array along with related TypedArray methods

=== 17th edition – ECMAScript 2026 ===
The 17th edition of ECMAScript (ES2026) includes the following additions:

- Upsert: getOrInsert and getOrInsertComputed for Map and WeakMap
- JSON.parse source text access: allow the "reviver" function, which transforms deserialized objects into other objects, access to the input source text in the form of a parse node. Add JSON.rawJSON, which generates the parse node, and JSON.isRawJSON. Extend JSON.stringify to use the rawJSON record when available, allowing round-tripping of JSON data.
- Iterator sequencing: Iterator.concat( ...items ), which concatenates iterators.
- Uint8Array to/from base64 and hex.
- Math.sumPrecise, a correctly-rounded floating-point summation function analogous to Python's math.fsum.
- Error.isError
- Array.fromAsync: similar in concept to Array.from, but acts on async iterators. Corresponds to for await.

=== ES.Next ===
ES.Next is a dynamic name that refers to whatever the next version is at the time of writing. This "current" standard is hosted at the tc39 website. Relative to the ratified versions it is called a "draft", but as indicated by the forewords to all ratified versions, "[t]he document at https://tc39.es/ecma262/ is the most accurate and up-to-date ECMAScript specification."

ES.Next features include finished proposals (aka "stage 4 proposals") as listed at finished proposals that are not part of a ratified specification. The language committee follows a "living spec" model, so these changes are part of the standard, and ratification is a formality.
