= Outline of the JavaScript programming language =

High-level programming language

The following outline is provided as an overview of and topical guide to JavaScript:

JavaScript (JS) (Note: /ˈdʒɑːvəskrɪpt/) is a programming language and core technology of the Web, alongside HTML and CSS. Created by Brendan Eich in 1995, it is maintained by Ecma International's TC39 technical committee, with related Web APIs maintained by W3C and WHATWG. As of 2025, JavaScript is the most widely used programming language on GitHub. (Note: Figure includes TypeScript, a strict syntactical superset of JavaScript that compiles to JavaScript. GitHub's 2025 Octoverse report groups the two languages together when measuring combined usage.)

== What type of language is JavaScript? ==
- Programming language – artificial language designed to communicate instructions to a machine, more so a computer.
  - High-level programming language – a programming language with strong abstraction from the details of the computer, such as having words, making it closer to natural language and easier to use than low-level programming languages (which are much more cryptic).
    - Compiled language – source code is converted (compiled) to an intermediate representation to be run.
      - Interpreted language – bytecode is executed by a virtual machine, which performs just-in-time compilation.
    - Dynamic programming language – allows various operations to be determined and executed at runtime, such as declaring data types, unlike in static languages, where the structure and types are fixed during compiling.
    - Multi-paradigm programming language – A programming paradigm is a relatively high-level way to conceptualize and structure the implementation of a computer program. JavaScript supports many paradigms.
      - Scripting language – programming language that is used for scripting, which is the act of writing a script, which is a relatively short and simple set of instructions which automate an otherwise manual process.
      - Event-driven programming language – the flow of programs is determined by external events, such as inputs from mice, keyboards, touchpads and touchscreens, and external sensors.
      - Imperative programming language – code directly controls execution flow and state change, explicit statements that change a program state
        - Procedural programming language – organized as procedures that call each other
        - Object-oriented programming language – organized as objects that contain both data structure and associated behavior, uses data structures consisting of data fields and methods together with their interactions (objects) to design programs
          - Class-based programming language – supports object-oriented programming in which inheritance is achieved by defining classes of objects, versus the objects themselves
          - Prototype-based programming language – includes object-oriented programming that avoids classes and implements inheritance via cloning of instances
      - Declarative programming language – its code declares properties of the desired result, but not how to compute it, describes what computation should perform, without specifying detailed state changes
        - Functional programming language – a desired result is declared as the value of a series of function evaluations, uses evaluation of mathematical functions and avoids state and mutable data
- Dynamic, duck – type checking is performed at runtime.
- Weakly typed language – enforces type rules at runtime.

== History of JavaScript ==
- ECMAScript version history
- Failed proposals
  - AtScript
- Former tools
  - Google Closure Tools
  - JavaScript OSA
  - JavaScript Style Sheets
  - Morfik
- Persons notable for developing JavaScript
  - Douglas Crockford
  - Ryan Dahl
  - Brendan Eich
  - John Resig

== Javascript fundamentals ==
- Userscript
  - Bookmarklet
- Userscript manager
- JavaScript syntax
- JavaScript library

== Issues and limits ==
- Security issues

== Specifications of the language ==
- ECMAScript – this specification defines and standardizes the JavaScript language, such as its vernacular, syntax, and so on.
  - ECMAScript version history
  - Ecma International – the non-profit organization responsible for ECMAScript and many other communication standards.

== Where JavaScript works (its runtime environments) ==
JavaScript works mainly in two main types of runtime environments:

- in web browsers, which power JavaScript from webpages using a JavaScript engine. This is referred to as being client-side.
  - List of JavaScript engines
- on Web servers, referred to as being server-side
  - List of server-side JavaScript implementations

== Adaptive web design ==
Adaptive web design

- CSS framework
- Media queries
- Parallax scrolling
- Progressive enhancement
- Unobtrusive JavaScript

== JavaScript toolchain ==
- Google Web Toolkit
- WebSharper

=== Libraries ===
- List of JavaScript libraries

=== Package managers ===
- Bun
- npm
- pnpm
- yarn

=== Bundlers ===
- Webpack
- Vite

=== Transpilers ===
- Babel

=== Linters and formatters ===
- ESLint
- JSHint
- JSLint

=== Testing tools ===
- Mocha

=== Build and development tools ===
- Vite

== General JavaScript concepts ==
- JavaScript templating
- CommonJS
- Comparison of JavaScript charting libraries
- CSS-in-JS
- Immediately invoked function expression
- Isomorphic JavaScript
- Prototype pollution
- Unobtrusive JavaScript
- Variable hoisting

== JavaScript dialects and related languages ==
- ActionScript – Object-oriented programming language created for the Flash multimedia platform
- AssemblyScript – TypeScript-based programming language
- ClojureScript – Dialect of the Lisp programming language on the Java platform
- CoffeeScript – Programming language which compiles to JavaScript
- Dart – Programming language
- Elm – Functional programming language
- Embedded JavaScript (EJS) – Webpage templating language using JavaScript
- Haxe – Cross-platform programming language
- JavaScript XML (JSX) – JavaScript syntax extension
- JS++ – Web programming language
- LiveScript – Functional programming language
- Nim – Programming language
- Opa – Programming language for developing scalable web applications
- PureScript – Strongly typed language that compiles to JavaScript
- Reason – Syntax extension and toolchain for OCaml
- ReScript – Programming language that compiles to JavaScript
- TypeScript – Programming language and superset of JavaScript

== JavaScript organizations ==
- OpenJS Foundation

== JavaScript publications ==
=== Books about JavaScript ===
- DOM Scripting – Jeremy Keith
- Eloquent JavaScript – Marijn Haverbeke
- How JavaScript Works – Douglas Crockford
- JavaScript Bible – Danny Goodman
- JavaScript: The Good Parts – Douglas Crockford
- Laura Lemay's Web Workshop: JavaScript – Laura Lemay
- Learn to Program with JavaScript – John Smiley
- Pro JavaScript Techniques and Secrets of the JavaScript Ninja – John Resig

== JavaScript programmers ==
- Douglas Crockford
- Danny Goodman
- Jeremy Keith
- Laura Lemay
- John Resig
- John Smiley

== See also ==
- Index of JavaScript-related articles
- Comparison of programming languages
- List of programmers
- Outline of computer programming
- Outline of software
- Outline of software engineering

Outlines of other programming languages

- Outline of the C programming language
- Outline of the C sharp programming language
- Outline of the C++ programming language
- Outline of the Java programming language
- Outline of the Perl programming language
- Outline of the Python programming language
- Outline of the Rust programming language
