= Hono.js =

Open-source web framework for JavaScript and TypeScript

Hono
- Developer: Yusuke Wada
- Written in: TypeScript
- Platform: Node.js, Deno, Bun, Cloudflare Workers, Vercel, AWS Lambda, Fastly Compute
- Type: Web framework
- License: MIT License
- Website: hono.dev

Hono is an open-source web framework for JavaScript and TypeScript. It is built around Web standards and is designed to run on JavaScript runtimes and platforms that provide compatible Web APIs, including Cloudflare Workers, Deno, Bun, Node.js, Vercel, AWS Lambda, and Fastly Compute.

Hono provides features for building web applications and APIs, including routing, middleware, request handling, and utilities. It uses Web Standard APIs such as the Request and Response interfaces, which allows applications to use the same programming model across supported JavaScript environments.

== Features ==
Hono includes middleware for functions such as authentication, CORS, caching, compression, logging, request identification, and HTTP security headers. The framework supports TypeScript and provides APIs for configuring middleware and routes.

The framework provides several routing implementations. These include RegExpRouter, SmartRouter, LinearRouter, and PatternRouter.

== Runtime support ==
Hono can be used with several JavaScript runtimes and deployment platforms. These include Cloudflare Workers, Deno, Bun, Vercel, AWS Lambda, Fastly Compute, and Node.js through a Node.js adapter.

== Performance ==
The Hono project publishes benchmarks for its routing implementations. In one benchmark for Cloudflare Workers, the RegExpRouter implementation recorded 402,820 operations per second, compared with 212,598 for itty-router, 297,036 for sunder, and 197,345 for worktop.

The results depend on the benchmark environment and methodology and are not a general measure of the performance of web frameworks.

== Development ==
Hono's source code is hosted on GitHub in the honojs/hono repository. The repository contains the framework's source code and development resources, including documentation and issue tracking.

Hono is distributed through the npm package registry. The package includes TypeScript declarations and does not specify runtime dependencies in its package metadata.

== See also ==
- Express.js
- Node.js
- Deno
