= Yarn (disambiguation) =

Yarn is a type of textile used for knitting.

Yarn may also refer to:

- Shaggy dog story, a long-winded anecdote also known as a yarn
- YARN, a software utility that is part of the Apache Hadoop collection
- Yarn, in Australian Aboriginal English, to share stories, sometimes for healing purposes (yarning circle)
- Yarn (package manager), a software packaging system for the Node.js JavaScript runtime environment
- Yarn (music group), a New York band
- "Yarn", an album by McCafferty, or its title track
