= Ryan Dahl =

American software engineer, creator of Node.js (born 1981)

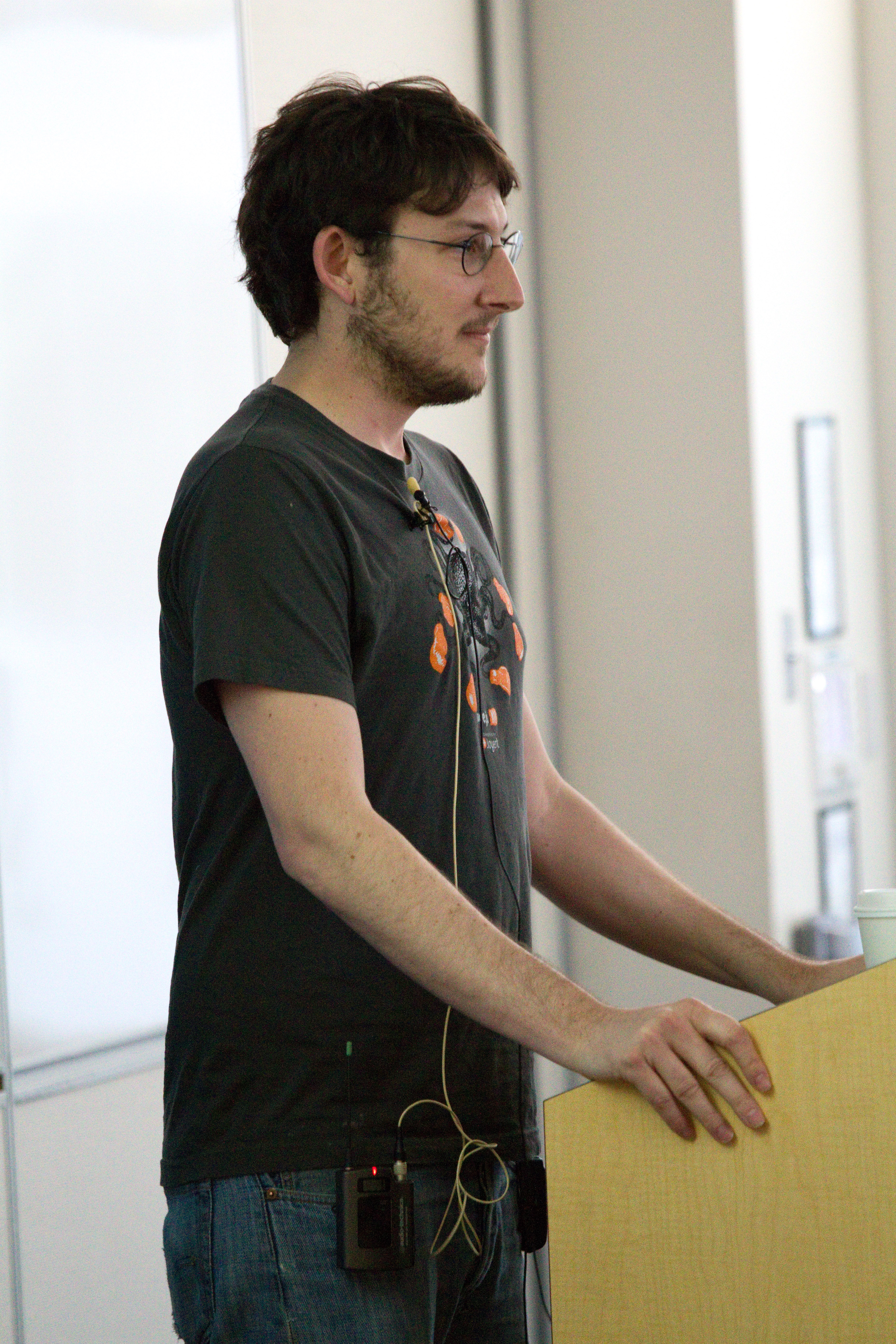
- Dahl in 2010
- Born: 1981 (age 44–45); San Diego, California, U.S
- Education: UC San Diego; University of Rochester
- Known for: Node.js and Deno
- Website: https://tinyclouds.org/

Ryan Dahl (born 1981) is an American software engineer who is best known for creating the Node.js JavaScript runtime as well as the Deno JavaScript/TypeScript runtime.

== Biography ==
Dahl grew up in San Diego, California. His mother bought him an Apple IIc when he was six years old, one of his first experiences with technology. Dahl attended a community college in San Diego and later transferred into UC San Diego where he studied mathematics. He went on to attend grad school for Mathematics at the University of Rochester where he studied algebraic topology, which he found "very abstract and beautiful" for a couple of years but later got bored of it because "it was not so applicable to real life".

=== Ruby work ===
After graduating, Dahl entered a Ph.D. program, but eventually dropped out, since he did not want to devote the rest of his life to mathematics. Instead, he left for South America, where he started developing web applications in Ruby.

=== Node.js ===
On May 27, 2009, Dahl released his project, the Node.js runtime.

In January 2012, after having worked on the Node.js project since 2009, Dahl announced that he would step away from the project and turn operational management over to NPM creator and former Joyent employee Isaac Z. Schlueter.

Dahl gave the following reason for moving on from the project:

"After three years of working on Node, this frees me up to work on research projects. I am still an employee at Joyent and will advise from the sidelines but I won’t be involved in the day-to-day bug fixes."

— Ryan Dahl

=== Deno ===
In 2018, Dahl announced Deno, a JavaScript/TypeScript runtime built with V8.
