= NodeOS =

- OS family: Linux (Unix-like)
- Working state: Current
- Repository: github.com/NodeOS/NodeOS
- Package manager: Npm
- License: MIT License
- Official website: node-os.com

NodeOS is a Linux distribution bundled with NodeJS. It uses npm as the default package manager.
