= Spip =

Spip may refer to

- SPIP, an image processing software for nano- and microscale analysis (developed by Image Metrology)
- Spip, a character in the Belgian comic Spirou et Fantasio
- SPIP, a free software content management system named after the comics character
- Separated Parents Information Programme, a UK programme for parents going through the family courts
