= Bolero (disambiguation) =

Bolero is a Cuban genre of song developed in the late 19th century.

Bolero may also refer to:

== Music and dance ==
- Bolero (Spanish dance), a 3/4 dance that originated in Spain in the late 18th century
- Boléro (Chopin), an 1834 piano work
- Boléro, a 1928 orchestral work by Maurice Ravel, commissioned by the dancer Ida Rubinstein, on which various performances have been based, including:
  - Boléro, choreographed by Bronislava Nijinska, principal dancer Ida Rubinstein, premiered at Paris Opéra, 1928
  - Boléro, choreographed by Maurice Béjart, Ballet of the 20th Century (La Monnaie, 1961)

=== Albums ===
- Bolero (Haustor album), 1985
- Boléro (Larry Coryell album), 1981
- Bolero (Mr. Children album), 1997
- Boleros (Juan Gabriel album), 2010
- Boleros (Tete Montoliu album), 1977
- Bolero, an album by Ángela Aguilar, 2024
- Bolero, an album by Isao Tomita, 2008
- Bolero, an album by Raffaella Carrà, 1984
- Bolero, an album by Stanley Jordan, 1994
- Boleros, an album by José Cura, 2002

=== Songs ===
- "Bolero - A Peacock's Tale", an instrumental portion of the King Crimson song "Lizard" featured on the 1971 album of the same name
- "Bolero", a 1980s pop song by German singer Fancy
- "Bolero / Kiss the Baby Sky / Wasurenaide", a 2009 CD single by Tohoshinki
- "Bolero", a song composed and interpreted by Italian singer Claudio Baglioni
- "Beck's Bolero", a rock instrumental composition recorded by English guitarist Jeff Beck in 1966

== Film ==
- Bolero (1934 film), a film starring George Raft and Carole Lombard
- Bolero (1942 film), a French comedy film directed by Jean Boyer
- Bolero (1984 film), a film directed by John Derek
- Bolero, a 1990 video-art film by Sabri Kaliç
- Bolero, a 1992 short animation film by Ivan Maximov
- Bolero, U.S. title of the 1981 French film Les Uns et les Autres
- The Bolero, a 1973 short documentary film
- Boléro (2024 film), a French biographical film directed by Anne Fontaine

== Transportation ==
- Mahindra Bolero, a line of SUVs produced by Indian company Mahindra & Mahindra Limited
- SEAT Bolero, a concept car from SEAT, shown in 1998
- MS Bolero, a Romanian ferry in service 1996–2000
- Gin Bolero, a paraglider design by Gin Gliders

== Other uses ==
- Bolero, Rumphi, a place in Northern Malawi
- Bolero jacket, a short jacket with long sleeves, also known as a "shrug"
- Bolero (horse), a dressage horse and notable sire
- Bolero, an Image Comics publication
- Bolero (magazine), published by Ringier in Switzerland
- Operation Bolero, codename for the World War II American troop buildup in the United Kingdom in preparation for D-Day
- Bolero, a programming framework for compiling F# code to WebAssembly

== See also ==
- Balero, a cup-and-ball game
