= ZeroVM =

- Original authors: Camuel Gilyadov, Constantine Peresypkin & Dmitri Bortok
- Developer: LiteStack which was acquired by Rackspace
- Stable release: 1.0 / 20 March 2014; 12 years ago
- Written in: C, assembly
- Operating system: Linux
- Platform: x86-64
- Type: Application virtualization
- License: Apache License 2.0
- Website: zerovm.org
- Repository: github.com/zerovm/zerovm

ZeroVM is an open source light-weight virtualization and sandboxing technology. It virtualizes a single process using the Google Native Client platform. Since only a single process is virtualized (instead of a full operating system), the startup overhead is in the order of 5 ms.

== Sandboxing ==
ZeroVM creates a sandbox around a single process, using technology based on Google Native Client (NaCl). The sandbox ensures that the application executed cannot access data in the host operating system, so it is safe to execute untrusted code. The programs executed in ZeroVM must first be cross-compiled to the NaCl platform. ZeroVM can only execute NaCl code compiled for the x86-64 platform, not the portable Native Client (PNaCl) format.

Code executed in ZeroVM cannot call normal system calls and initially cannot interact with the host environment. All communication with the outside world takes place over channels, which must be declared before the program starts. Outside the sandbox, a channel can be connected to a local file, to a pipe, or to another ZeroVM instance. Inside the sandbox, the program sees the channel as a file descriptor. The sandboxed program can read/write data from/to the channel, but does not know where the channel is connected in the host.

Programs compiled for ZeroVM can optionally use the ZeroVM Runtime library called ZRT. This library aims to provide the program with a POSIX environment. It does this by replacing parts of the C standard library. In particular, ZRT replaces C file input/output functions such as fopen and opendir with versions that operate on an in-memory filesystem. The root filesystem is provided as a tarball. This allows a program to "see" a normal Unix environment.

The ZRT also replaces C date and time functions such as time to give programs a fixed and deterministic environment. With fixed inputs, every execution is guaranteed to give the same result. Even non-functional programs become deterministic in this restricted environment. This makes programs easier to debug since their behavior is fixed.

== Integration with Swift ==
ZeroVM has been integrated with Swift, the distributed object storage component of OpenStack. When the ZeroCloud middleware is installed into Swift, a client can make a request to Swift containing a ZeroVM program. The program is then executed directly on the storage nodes. This means that the program has direct access to the data.

== History ==
ZeroVM was developed by LiteStack, an Israeli startup. The first commit in the zerovm Git repository was added in November 2011. LiteStack was bought by Rackspace in October 2013. ZeroVM participated in Techstars Cloud 2013 incubator program and got $500,000 in seed funding. The first ZeroVM Design Summit was held in January 2014 at the University of Texas at San Antonio.

== See also ==
- Google Native Client
- LXC (LinuX Containers)
- seccomp
- Docker (software)
