= Pnpm =

JavaScript package manager

pnpm
- Developers: Zoltan Kochan and other contributors
- Release: 28 June 2017; 9 years ago
- Stable release: 12.0.0 / 26 August 2026; 13 days ago
- Written in: TypeScript, JavaScript, Rust
- Platform: Cross-platform
- Type: Package manager
- License: MIT License
- Website: pnpm.io
- Repository: github.com/pnpm/pnpm

pnpm (short for Performant npm) is one of the main JavaScript package managers, originally developed in 2016 by Rico Sta. Cruz for the Node.js JavaScript runtime environment as a disk space-efficient alternative to npm.

== History ==
The first commit to the pnpm repository was made on 27 January 2016. The pnpm project was inspired by Alexander Gugel’s ied – an early experiment that used symbolic links to organise node_modules. The first stable release (v1.0.0) arrived on 28 June 2017. Over the following years, pnpm gained traction for its novel approach to dependency hoisting and its ability to handle large monorepos efficiently. On August 26, 2026, pnpm version 12.0 was released, which was a rewrite of pnpm from TypeScript to Rust.

== Technical design ==
pnpm's core innovation is its use of a global content-addressable store to manage dependencies. Instead of copying files into each project's node_modules folder, it stores a single copy of each package version in a central location (e.g., ~/.pnpm-store) and creates hard links from the project to these files. Symbolic links are then used to construct the dependency tree within the project.

== See also ==
- Bun
- npm
- Yarn
- Deno
