= Anders Hejlsberg =

Danish software engineer (born 1960)

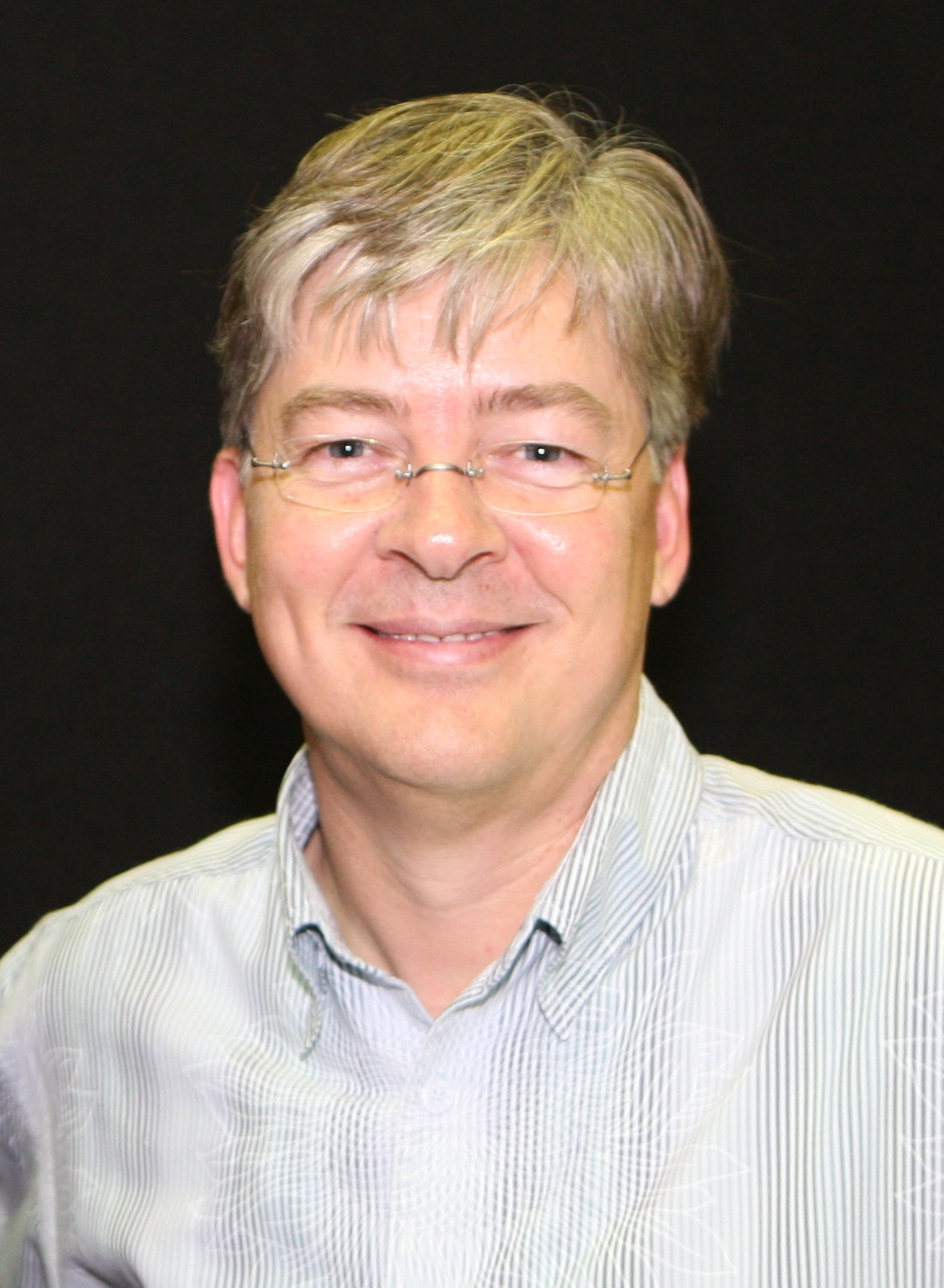
- Hejlsberg in 2008
- Born: 2 December 1960 (age 65); Copenhagen, Denmark
- Education: Technical University of Denmark
- Occupations: Programmer; Systems architect
- Employer: Microsoft
- Known for: Turbo Pascal; Delphi; C# TypeScript
- Title: Technical Fellow
- Spouse: Liz Hejlsberg (m. 1994)
- Awards: 2001 Dr. Dobb's Excellence in Programming Award

Anders Hejlsberg (/ˈhaɪlzbɜːrɡ/; Danish: [ˈhɑjlsˌpɛɐ̯ˀ]; born 2 December 1960) is a Danish software engineer who co-designed several programming languages and development tools. He was the original author of Turbo Pascal and the chief architect of Delphi. He currently works for Microsoft as the lead architect of C# and core developer on TypeScript.

== Early life ==
Hejlsberg was born in Copenhagen, Denmark, and studied Electrical Engineering at the Technical University of Denmark.

== Career ==
While at the university in 1980, he began writing programs for the Nascom microcomputer, including a Pascal compiler which was initially marketed as the Blue Label Software Pascal for the Nascom-2. The compiler itself was largely inspired by the "Tiny Pascal" compiler in Niklaus Wirth's Algorithms + Data Structures = Programs. He rewrote it for CP/M and MS-DOS, marketing it first as Compas Pascal, then PolyPascal. Borland licensed the compiler and sold it as Turbo Pascal. The CP/M version of the PolyPascal compiler already came with a built in integrated development environment as well as a stand-alone PolyPascal Editor (PPE).

In Borland's hands, Turbo Pascal became one of the most commercially successful Pascal compilers. Hejlsberg remained with PolyData until the company came under financial stress and in 1989 he moved to California to become Chief Engineer at Borland. During this time, he developed Turbo Pascal further and became the chief architect for the team that produced Borland Delphi, which replaced Turbo Pascal.

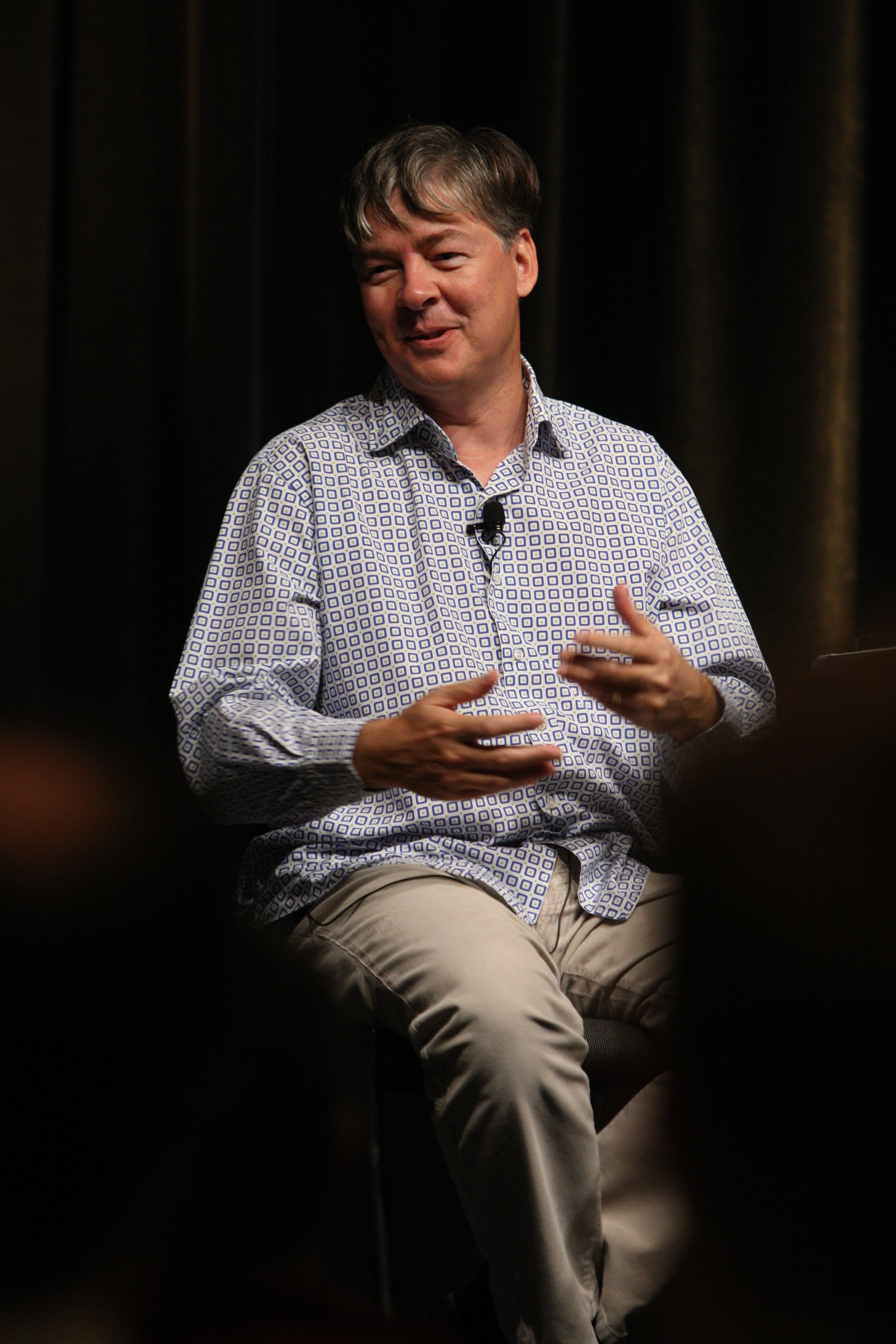
Hejlsberg at the Professional Developers Conference 2008

In 1996, Hejlsberg left Borland and joined Microsoft. One of his first achievements was the J++ programming language and the Windows Foundation Classes; he also became a Microsoft Distinguished Engineer and Technical Fellow. Since 2000, he has been the lead architect of the team developing the C# language. In 2012 Hejlsberg announced a new Microsoft project, TypeScript, a superset of JavaScript.

== Awards ==
Hejlsberg received the 2001 Dr. Dobb's Excellence in Programming Award for his work on Turbo Pascal, Delphi, C# and the Microsoft .NET Framework.

Together with Shon Katzenberger, Scott Wiltamuth, Todd Proebsting, Erik Meijer, Peter Hallam, and Peter Sollich, Anders was awarded a Technical Recognition Award for Outstanding Technical Achievement for their work on the C# language in 2007.

== See also ==
- Timeline of programming languages
- C# programming language

== Bibliography ==
=== Published works ===
- The C# Programming Language, 2nd edition, Addison-Wesley Professional, ISBN 0-321-33443-4, 2006-06-09
- The C# Programming Language, 3rd edition, Addison-Wesley Professional, ISBN 0-321-56299-2, 2008-10-18
- The C# Programming Language, 4th edition, Addison-Wesley Professional, ISBN 0-321-74176-5, ISBN 978-0-321-74176-9, October 2010

== See also ==
- List of pioneers in computer science
