= IITRAN =

Discontinued programming language

IITRAN is a discontinued programming language created in the mid-1960s and designed as a first language for students. The primary designer of the language, William S. Worley, also contributed to the design of PL/I, and the two languages have similar syntax. The name derives from Illinois Institute of Technology, where it was developed.

The IITRAN language was initially implemented for IBM 7040, with a compiler made available to students in 1964. This was followed shortly by an IBM System/360 implementation in 1966, for which the language was partially redesigned by a committee led by Dr. Peter G. Lykos. In the early 1970s, a compiler was developed for the Univac 1108 platform. Programming was done using punched cards.

IITRAN was designed and developed in response to the increasing demand for a computer language which would meet the following specifications:

1. It should be clear, concise, and easily learned, even for those who have had no previous experience with computers or mathematics;
2. It should bear as close a resemblance as possible to the English language;
3. It should be free of awkward restrictions and limitations;
4. It should be consistent with mathematical and logical foundations;
5. It should allow processing of a great number of individual programs in a very short time;
6. It should serve as a computational tool for students of science and engineering;
7. It should process a clear, easily understood, set of diagnostic error messages.

(Bauer, p. V)

There was a Spanish language version of IITRAN at IIT as well. It utilized Spanish keywords rather than English ones. For example, the keyword read was replaced by leer.

== Bibliography ==
- IITRAN / 360: Self-Instructional Manual and Text, Bauer, Charles R. et al., Addison Wesley Publishing, 1967.
- The IITRAN Programming Language, R. Dewar et al., CACM 12(10):569-575 (Oct 1969).
