= Emscripten =

Program converting LLVM bytecode to WebAssembly

- Original author: Alon Zakai
- Release: 22 October 2011; 14 years ago
- Stable release: 6.0.13 / 19 October 2026; 2 days ago
- Written in: C, C++, JavaScript
- Type: Compiler
- License: MIT License, University of Illinois/NCSA Open Source License
- Website: emscripten.org
- Repository: github.com/emscripten-core/emscripten

Emscripten is an LLVM/Clang-based compiler that compiles LLVM IR to WebAssembly, primarily for execution in web browsers.

Emscripten allows applications and libraries written in C or C++ to be compiled ahead of time and run efficiently in web browsers, typically at speeds comparable to or faster than interpreted or dynamically compiled JavaScript. It even emulates an entire POSIX operating system, enabling programmers to use functions from the C standard library (libc).

With the more recent development of the WebAssembly System Interface (WASI) and WebAssembly runtimes such as Node.js, Wasmtime, and Wasmer, Emscripten can also be used to compile to WebAssembly for execution in non-web embeddings as well.

== Usage ==
Emscripten has been used to port a number of C/C++ code bases to WebAssembly, including Unreal Engine 3, SQLite, MeshLab, Bullet physics, AutoCAD, and a subset of the Qt application framework. Other examples of software ported to WebAssembly via Emscripten include the following:

=== Game engines ===
The Unity, Defold, and Godot game engines provide an export option to HTML5, utilizing Emscripten. Unreal Engine had this export option but it has been migrated out of the engine to a community member plug in. The Source Engine, has a community developed port for Emscripten dubbed "HalfLife2JS".

=== Frameworks & toolkits ===
openFrameworks exports native C++ applications to HTML5 via Emscripten. emscripten-qt permits compiling applications written using the Qt application framework to WebAssembly.

=== Software archiving ===
In December 2014, the Internet Archive launched a DOSBox emulator compiled in Emscripten to provide browser-based access to thousands of archived MS-DOS and PC programs.

== Creation ==
Emscripten was created by Alon Zakai in 2010, motivated by his desire to port his fork of the open-source first-person shooter game Sauerbraten, known as Syntensity, to the web. Sauerbraten (also known as Cube 2) is an open-source FPS game, and Syntensity was Zakai's project that extended the Cube 2 Engine for greater flexibility. Observing the increasing shift of applications to web browsers, Zakai began developing Emscripten as an LLVM-to-JavaScript compiler, aiming to make it possible to run existing C and C++ code, such as game engines, directly in the browser. In early blog posts, Zakai explained that his long-term goal was "to run Syntensity, or a smaller version of it, on the web", and Emscripten was released as open source shortly after its initial development, making it available for the broader community to experiment with and contribute to.

In 2019, Emscripten changed from producing JavaScript or asm.js output by default to producing code in the WebAssembly binary format added by browsers in response to the challenges of using verbose JavaScript as a compilation target. Unlike the prior asm.js backend, the WebAssembly code generator backend was merged into upstream LLVM development and is shared between Emscripten and other tools producing WebAssembly.

== See also ==
- asm.js
- Google Native Client (PNaCl)
- WebAssembly
