= Zen Bound =

2009 video game

- Developer: Secret Exit
- Publisher: Chillingo Ltd
- Platforms: iOS, Maemo, Mac OS X, Linux, Microsoft Windows, Android, Nintendo Switch
- Release: Zen Bound; March 9, 2009; Zen Bound 2: iOS; April 1, 2010; Windows, Mac OS X; November 16, 2010; Android; March 19, 2012; Linux; February 14, 2013; Nintendo Switch; May 24, 2018
- Genre: Puzzle
- Mode: Single-player

Zen Bound is a puzzle game for the iOS, Android, and Maemo platforms (Nokia N900), developed by Secret Exit. The game was announced in September 2008 via the company's discussion board, and officially released via the App Store on February 24, 2009, and via Ovi Store on June 16, 2010. An Android port was released on March 19, 2012. The game has received press attention for its unique gameplay. A lite version of the game was also released for free which featured 2 levels of the game. A sequel, Zen Bound 2, was released for iOS on April 1, 2010, for Steam on November 16, 2010, and for the Nintendo Switch in Europe and North America on May 24, 2018.

== Gameplay ==
The goal of the game is to paint various objects. In each level the player is given an object with an attached rope which varies in length depending on the level. Using a mouse or touch screen and tilt controls, the player attempts to wrap the object with the rope. Each time the rope is laid down on the object, the area near the rope gets covered by paint. The challenge is getting the required percentage of an object painted with only a finite length of rope. There are three targets in each level - minimum, medium and maximum coverage.

Some levels require nails protruding from the objects to be entwined in rope rather than having to cover the object's surface.

== Reception ==
=== Zen Bound ===
Zen Bound

Aggregate score
Aggregator	Score
GameRankings	98%

Review scores
Publication	Score
GameSpot	9/10
Gamezebo	4/5
IGN	9.5/10
Pocket Gamer	5/5
VideoGamer.com	9/10

Zen Bound received universal acclaim according to the review aggregation website GameRankings.

==== Awards ====
5th IMGAwards (International Mobile Gaming Awards) (2008): Excellence in 3D

=== Zen Bound 2 ===
Zen Bound 2

Aggregate score
Aggregator	Score
Metacritic	(iOS) 80/100 (PC, NS) 78/100

Review scores
Publication	Score
Eurogamer	(PC) 8/10
IGN	(iOS) 8.5/10 (PC) 7.5/10
Jeuxvideo.com	16/20
MacLife	(iOS) 4.5/5
Nintendo World Report	(NS) 8.5/10
Pocket Gamer	(iOS) 4.5/5 (NS) 3.5/5

Zen Bound 2 received "favorable" reviews on all platforms according to the review aggregation website Metacritic.

== Abandonment ==
Neither Zen Bound nor its sequel are available for purchase in the Apple App Store or the Google Play Store, but Zen Bound 2 remains available via Steam and the Nintendo eStore as of April 2022.
