= Laura Lemay =

American technical writer (born 1967)

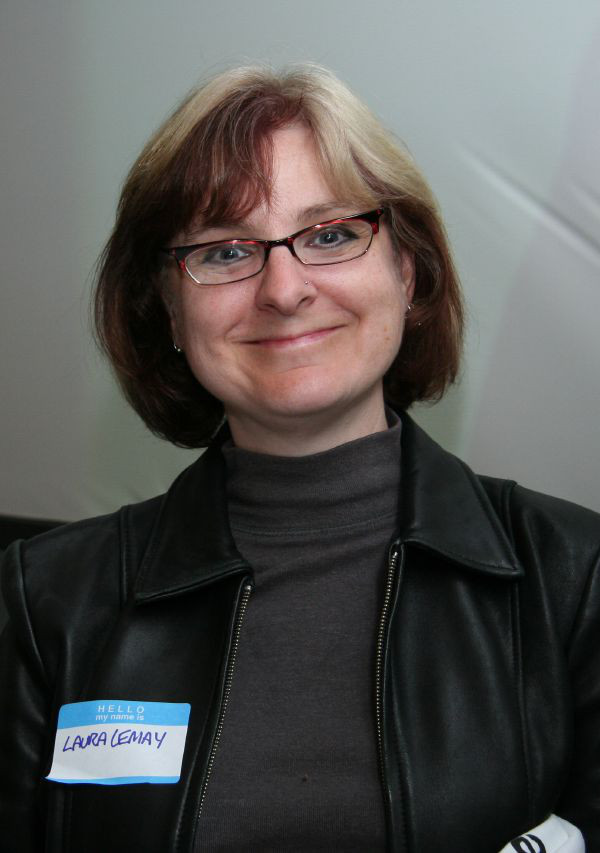
- Lemay in 2006
- Born: August 1, 1967 (age 59)
- Occupations: Freelance technical writer; Author
- Website: lauralemay.com

Laura Lemay (born August 1, 1967) is an American author of technical books, most notably starting the SAMS Publishing "Teach Yourself" series.

== Biography ==
Lemay works as a freelance technical writer. Beginning in the 1990s, she authored a series of instructional texts on web publishing, HTML, and Java. Her first book, Teach Yourself Web Publishing with HTML in a Week, demonstrated that HTML could be learned easily and was the second guide on HTML to appear on the market. Her second book, Teach Yourself Java in 21 Days, promised to do the same for prospective Java users, and her 1997 book The Official Guide to Marimba's Castanet focused on push media. 1997's Laura Lemay's Web Workshop: Javascript received positive reviews, and was praised as a "fine book" that came with helpful software.

Andrew Leonard, writing for Salon.com, noted that Lemay's books (by the time of his 1997 article he counted 23) were an example of "Beta books", books about software that come bundled with software, and are regularly updated.

== Personal life ==
Lemay lives in the Santa Cruz hills with her husband Eric. On December 19, 2022, she announced on her blog lauralemay.com that she had throat cancer.

== Books ==
- 2010 – Sams Teach Yourself Web Publishing with HTML and CSS in One Hour a Day, Sixth Edition – ISBN 0672330962
- 2007 – Sams Teach Yourself Java 6 in 21 Days – ISBN 0672329433
- 2006 – Sams Teach Yourself Web Publishing with HTML and CSS in One Hour a Day – ISBN 0672328860
- 2004 – Sams Teach Yourself Java 2 in 21 Days – ISBN 0672326280
- 2003 – Sams Teach Yourself Web Publishing with HTML & XHTML in 21 Days – ISBN 0672325195
- 2003 – Sams Teach Yourself Web Publishing With HTML and XHTML – ISBN 9780672325199
- 2002 – Sams Teach Yourself Perl in 21 Days – ISBN 0672320355
- 2001 – Sams Teach Yourself Web Publishing with HTML and XHTML in 21 Days, Professional Reference Edition – ISBN 0672320770
- 2000 – Sams Teach Yourself Web Publishing with HTML 4 in 21 Days, Professional Reference Edition, Second Edition – ISBN 0672318385
- 1999 – Sams Teach Yourself Java 2 Platform in 21 Days: Complete Compiler Edition – ISBN 0672316471
- 1998 – Sams Teach Yourself Java 1.2 in 21 Days Complete Compiler Edition – ISBN 0672315343
- 1998 – Sams Teach Yourself Java 1.2 in 21 Days – ISBN 1575213907
- 1998 – Web Publishing With HTML 4 in a Week: Complete Starter Kit – ISBN 0672313448
- 1997 – Sams Teach Yourself Java 1.1 in 21 Days – ISBN 1575213923
- 1997 – Teach Yourself Web Publishing With HTML in a Week – ISBN 1575213362
- 1997 – Laura Lemay's Web Workshop: Designing With Stylesheets, Tables, and Frames – ISBN 1575212498
- 1997 – Sams Teach Yourself Web Publishing With HTML 3.2 In14 Days – ISBN 1575213761
- 1997 – Laura Lemay's Electronic Web Workshop – ISBN 1575213141
- 1997 – Teach Yourself Java 1.1 in 21 Days – ISBN 1575211424
- 1997 – Laura Lemay's Java 1.1 Interactive Course – ISBN 1571690832
- 1997 – Laura Lemay's Guide to Sizzling Web Site Design – ISBN 1575212218
- 1997 – Official Marimba Guide to Castanet – ISBN 1575212552
- 1997 – Teach Yourself Web Publishing With HTML 3.2 in 14 Days: Second Professional Reference Edition – ISBN 1575213052
- 1997 – Aprendiendo HTML Para Web En Una Semana (Paperback) – ISBN 9688805785
- 1997 – Teach Yourself Java 1.1 In 21 Days – ISBN 9781575211428
- 1996 – Teach Yourself Web Publishing With HTML 3.0 in a Week – ISBN 1575210649
- 1996 – Teach Yourself Java in 21 Days: Professional Reference Edition – ISBN 1575211831
- 1996 – Teach Yourself Visual J++ in 21 Days – ISBN 1575211580
- 1996 – Teach Yourself Sunsoft Java Workshop in 21 Days – ISBN 1575211599
- 1996 – Creating Commercial Web Pages – ISBN 1575211262
- 1996 – Teach Yourself Web Publishing With HTML 3.2 in a Week – ISBN 1575211920
- 1996 – Graphics & Web Page Design – ISBN 1575211254
- 1996 – Laura Lemay's Web Workshop Javascript – ISBN 1575211416
- 1996 – Laura Lemay's Web Workshop: 3D Graphics & VRML 2.0 – ISBN 1575211432
- 1996 – Laura Lemay's Web Workshop: Microsoft Frontpage – ISBN 1575211491
- 1996 – Laura Lemay's Web Workshop: Netscape Navigator Gold 3 – ISBN 1575211289
- 1996 – Teach Yourself Cafe in 21 Days – ISBN 1575211572
- 1996 – Teach Yourself Web Publishing With HTML 3.2 in 14 Days: Premier Edition – ISBN 1575210967
- 1996 – Teach Yourself Java for Macintosh in 21 Days – ISBN 1568302800
- 1996 – Web Design Electronic Resource Kit – ISBN 1575212641
- 1996 – Web Publishing Electronic Resource Kit – ISBN 157521265X
- 1996 – Teach Yourself Java in 21 Days – ISBN 1575210304
- 1995 – Complete Teach Yourself HTML Kit – ISBN 1575210630
- 1995 – Teach Yourself Web Publishing in 14 Days – ISBN 1575210142
- 1995 – Teach Yourself More Web Publishing With HTML in a Week – ISBN 1575210053
- 1995 – Teach Yourself Web Publishing With HTML in a Week – ISBN 0672306670
