= Yarn (band) =

American alternative country band formed in 2006

Yarn is a North Carolina-based Americana band that formed in Brooklyn, New York, in 2006. The group is composed of songwriter Blake Christiana on vocals and guitar, Rick Bugel on bass, and Robert Bonhomme on drums, and a rotating group of electric guitarists, including Matteo Joseph Recchio and Joel Timmons. Almost every live date includes a surprise guests or featured soloists.

Yarn have recorded 11 albums.

== History ==
AllMusic called them a hard-working live act that plays up to 170 dates a year. They have landed on the Grammy ballot four times, received attention from the Americana Music Association, and placed top-five on both Radio and Records and the AMA album charts. Their latest project "Lucky 13" involves releasing new singles, with "A" and "B" side, on the 13th of each month, charging $5 for an entire year's worth of music.

Yarn host an annual music and alternative arts festival, "Yarnival". In 2025 it took place in Axton, Virginia.

== Band members ==
- Blake Christiana - vocals, acoustic guitar, electric guitar
- Rotating - guitars, vocals
- Rick Bugel - bass
- Robert Bonhomme - drums
