= List of PC games (V) =

The following page is an alphabetical section from the list of PC games.

== V ==
Name	Developer	Publisher	Genre(s)	Operating system(s)	Date released
Valorant	Riot Games	Riot Games	First-person shooter	Microsoft Windows	June 2, 2020
Vampire: The Masquerade – Bloodlines	Troika Games	Activision	Action role-playing	Microsoft Windows	November 16, 2004
Vampire: The Masquerade – Redemption	Nihilistic Software	Activision	Role-playing	Microsoft Windows, macOS	June 7, 2000
Victoria: An Empire Under The Sun	Paradox Development Studios	Paradox Development Studios	Grand strategy	Microsoft Windows, macOS	2003
Victoria II	Paradox Development Studios	Paradox Interactive	Grand strategy	Microsoft Windows, macOS	August 13, 2010
Victoria III	Paradox Development Studios	Paradox Interactive	Grand strategy	Microsoft Windows, macOS, Linux	October 25, 2022
Vivisector: Beast Within	Action Forms	1C, Brigades	First-person shooter, survival horror	Microsoft Windows	January 5, 2006
Voxatron	Lexaloffle Games	Lexaloffle Games	Action-adventure	Microsoft Windows, Linux, macOS	October 31, 2011
V Rising	Stunlock Studios	Stunlock Studios	Survival	Microsoft Windows, macOS	May 17, 2022
