= Gin Gliders =

South Korean aircraft manufacturer

Gin Gliders Inc.
- Company type: Privately held company
- Industry: Aerospace
- Founded: 1998
- Founder: Gin Seok Song
- Headquarters: Yongin, South Korea
- Products: Paragliders
- Website: www.gingliders.com

Gin Gliders Inc. is a South Korean aircraft manufacturer based in Yongin, founded by competition pilot Gin Seok Song in 1998. The company specializes in the design and manufacture of paragliders in the form of ready-to-fly aircraft.

The company's paragliders are designed by Gin Seok Song and Robert Graham.

The company has produced a wide variety of paragliders, including the competition Gin Boomerang, the intermediate Bolero Plus, Gangster, Nomad and Oasis, as well as the two-place Bongo.

== Paragliders ==
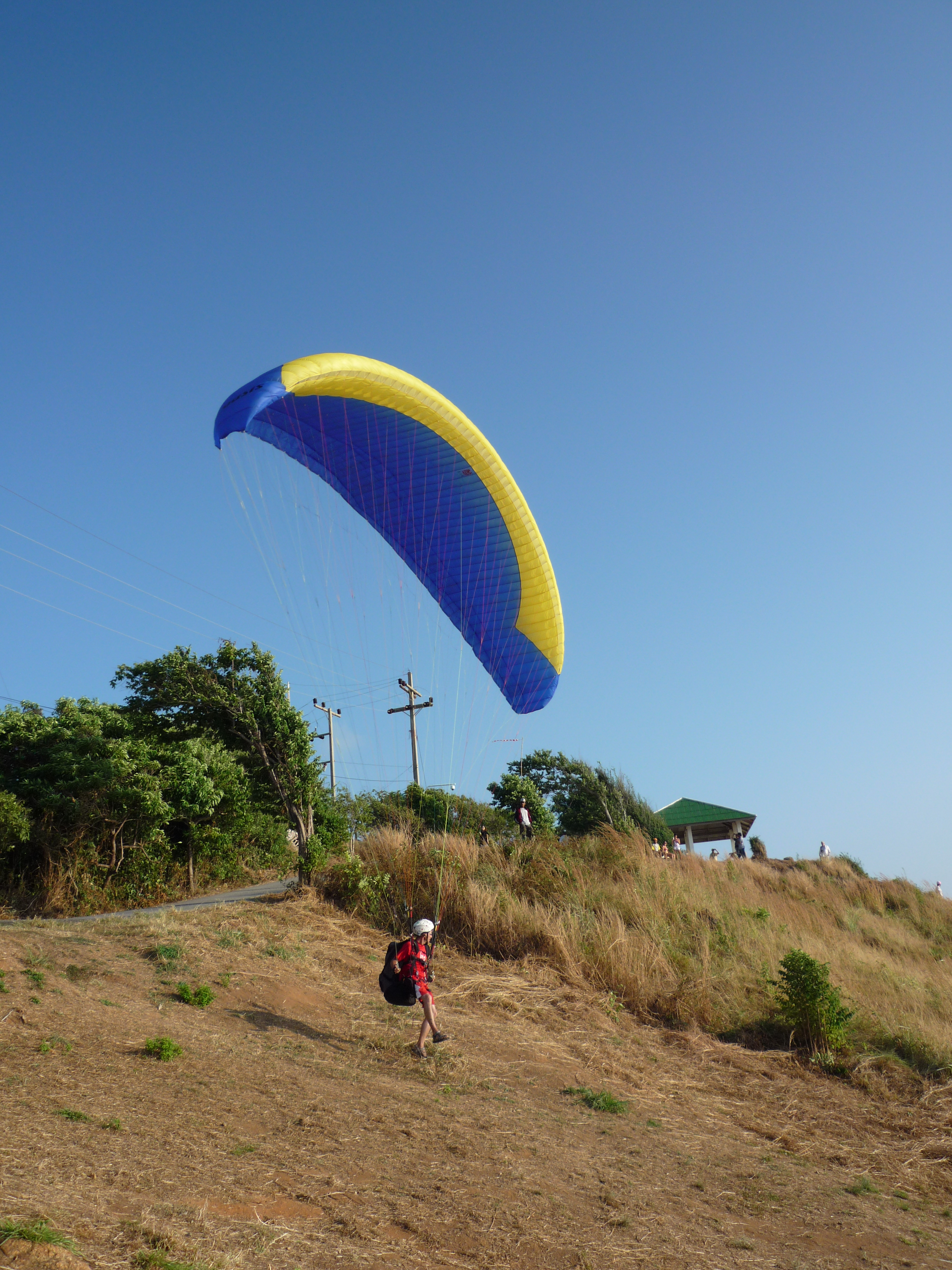
Gin Oasis

Summary of aircraft built by Gin Gliders:

- Gin Atlas
- Gin Bandit
- Gin Bobcat
- Gin Bolero
- Gin Bolero Plus
- Gin Bonanza
- Gin Bonanza 2
- Gin Bonanza 3
- Gin Bongo
- Gin Boomerang
- Gin Camino
- Gin Carrera
- Gin Explorer
- Gin Explorer 2
- Gin Falcon
- Gin Fluid
- Gin Fuse
- Gin Gangster
- Gin GTO
- Gin Leopard
- Gin Nano
- Gin Nomad
- Gin Oasis
- Gin Osprey
- Gin Pegasus
- Gin Puma
- Gin Rage
- Gin Safari
- Gin Sprint
- Gin Tribe
- Gin Vantage
- Gin Yak
- Gin Yeti
