= Embedded JavaScript =

Webpage templating language using JavaScript

EJS (Embedded Javascript)
- Original author: Edward Benson
- Initial release: 2007
- Type: Web Template System, Templating language
- License: MIT License
- Website: ejs.co
- Repository: github.com/mde/ejs

Embedded JavaScript (EJS) is a web templating system or templating language that allows developers to code HTML markup with simple JavaScript. It mainly uses logic from JavaScript, which makes benefits for developers who already know JavaScript language before. EJS is frequently used in Node.js, it means that any platform that supports JavaScript language also supports EJS.

== History ==
EJS was first published in 2007 by Edward Benson under the MIT license, allowing developers to embed JavaScript logic directly into HTML. EJS was written as a JavaScript port of the ERB templating system, which blended Ruby within HTML in a similar way. EJS was the first in-browser templating system to follow this pattern. It was quickly incorporated into projects such as Express, RabbitMQ and Alpine Linux. After publication, the project was quickly adopted by Bitovi, who became its primary maintainer as part of the DoneJS ecosystem of tools. EJS has since been re-written and re-published by many different authors.

In 2025, the most popular EJS implementation is by Matthew Eernisse, licensed under the Apache License, version 2.0. It include features such as subtemplates that can be included in other templates and caching to improve performance.
