= Comparison of server-side web frameworks =

This is a comparison of notable web frameworks, software used to build and deploy web applications. This article focuses on frameworks used for building the backend.

== General ==
Basic information about each framework.

Systems listed on a light purple background are no longer in active development.

=== ASP.NET ===
Project	Current stable version	Release date	License
ASP.NET Dynamic Data			Proprietary
Base One Foundation Component Library (BFC)	7.51	2018-06-01	Proprietary
Component-based Scalable Logical Architecture (CSLA)	4.11.2	2019-07-31	MIT
MonoRail	2.1	2011-03-17	Apache

=== C++ ===
Project	Current stable version	Release date	License
Drogon	1.9.5	2024-06-08	MIT
Poco	1.15.4	2026-09-22[±]	Boost Software License
Wt	4.10.4	2024-03-06	GPL, Proprietary

=== ColdFusion Markup Language (CFML) ===
Project	Current stable version	Release date	License
ColdBox Platform	7.3.0	2024-05-14[±]	Apache v2

=== Elixir ===
Project	Current stable version	Release date	License
Phoenix	1.8.0	2025-08-05; 15 months ago	MIT License

=== Haskell ===
Project	Current stable version	Release date	License
Snap	1.1.3.2	2023-07-19	BSD-3
Yesod	1.6.24.5	2023-09-14; 3 years ago	MIT License

=== Java ===
Project	Current stable version	Release date	License
Apache Click	2.3.0	2011-03-27	Apache 2.0
Apache OFBiz	24.09.08	2026-10-12; 31 days ago	Apache 2.0
Apache Shale	1.0.4	2007-12-19	Apache
Apache Sling	12	2022-03-18	Apache 2.0
Apache Struts	7.4.0	2026-09-17; 56 days ago	Apache 2.0
Apache Tapestry	5.9.0	2025-02-11; 21 months ago	Apache 2.0
Apache Wicket	10.11.0	2026-08-30; 2 months ago	Apache 2.0
AppFuse	3.5.0	2015-02-20	Apache 2.0
Eclipse Mojarra (Jakarta Faces RI)	4.1.0	2024-06-05; 2 years ago	CDDL, GNU GPL 2, Apache 2.0
Eclipse RAP	4.1	2024-12-04	Eclipse
Grails	8.0.0	2026-10-04; 39 days ago	Apache
Google Web Toolkit	2.12.2	2025-03-03	Apache 2.0
JBoss Seam	3.1.0 final	2012-01-13	GNU LGPL
JWt	4.15.0	2026-10-28; 15 days ago	GPL, Proprietary
Netty	4.2.9	2025-12-15; 10 months ago	Apache License 2.0
OpenLaszlo	4.9.0	2010-10-21	CPL
Oracle ADF	12.2.1.4	2019-10-09	Oracle Technology Network Developer License
Play	3.0.9	2025-09-11; 14 months ago	Apache 2.0
Spring	7.0.5	2026-02-18; 8 months ago	Apache 2.0
Stripes	1.6.0	2015-07-23	Apache
Vaadin	25.0.0	2025-12-18; 10 months ago	Apache 2.0
Wavemaker	11.6.0	2024-03-03	Apache
WebObjects	5.4.3	2008-09-15	Proprietary

=== JavaScript ===
Project	Current stable version	Release date	License
Analog	2.9.7	2026-11-11; 32 hours ago	MIT License
Express.js	5.3.0	2026-10-09; 34 days ago	MIT License
Fastify	5.12.8	2026-11-02; 10 days ago	MIT License
Meteor	3.3	2025-06-17; 16 months ago	MIT License
NestJS	12.4.1	2026-11-09; 3 days ago	MIT License
Next.js	16.4.6	2026-11-09; 3 days ago	MIT License
Nuxt	4.6.4	2026-11-02; 10 days ago	MIT License
Remix	8.5.1	2026-10-27; 16 days ago	MIT License
Sails.js	1.5.11	2024-05-24; 2 years ago	MIT License
SvelteKit	1.15.5	2023-04-13; 3 years ago	MIT License

=== Perl ===
Project	Current stable version	Release date	License
Catalyst	5.90131	2023-07-20[±]	Artistic, GPL
Dancer	2.0.1	2025-10-22[±]	Artistic, GPL
Mojolicious	9.42	2025-10-91[±]	Artistic

=== PHP ===
Project	Start date	Current stable version	Release date	License
CakePHP	2005-08	5.4.4	2026-11-01;11 days ago	MIT
CodeIgniter	2006-02-28	4.6.4	2025-12-12;11 months ago	MIT
Fat-Free	2009-09	3.9.2	2025-12-02[±]	GPLv3
FuelPHP	2011-08	1.9.0	2021-12-28[±]	MIT
Gyroscope	2008-11-20	20.4	2023-11-24	BSD
Jamroom	2003-07-28	7.0.3	2026-03-15[±]	MPL
Laminas (formerly Zend Framework)	2006-03	3.8.0	2024-11-21	New BSD
Laravel	2011-07-31	13.42.0	2026-11-10; 2 days ago	MIT
Li3 (Lithium)	2009-10	2.0.2	2025-08-18[±]	BSD
Phalcon	2012-11-14	5.10.0	2025-12-25	BSD
Pop PHP	2012-03-19	7.0.0	2026-08-17	BSD Licence
PRADO	2004-01	4.3.1	2025-05-21[±]	New BSD
SilverStripe	2007-02-03	6.2.0	2026-04-17[±]	BSD
Smart.Framework	2015-02-01	svn.2755	2026-01-17[±]	BSD
Symfony	2005-10	8.1.4	2026-08-07[±]	MIT
Yii	2008-12-03	3.0	2025-12-31[±]	New BSD

=== Python ===
Project	Current stable version	Release date	License
BlueBream	1.0	2011-01-18; 15 years ago	ZPL
CherryPy	18.10.0	2024-06-15; 2 years ago	BSD
CubicWeb	5.0.1	2025-08-11; 15 months ago	LGPL
Django	6.1.3	2026-11-03; 3 months ago	BSD
FastAPI	0.162.4	2026-11-10; 2 days ago	MIT
Flask	3.1.3	2026-02-19; 8 months ago	BSD
Google App Engine	1.9.91	2020-05-11; 6 years ago	LGPL, Proprietary
Grok	6.2	2026-02-16; 8 months ago	ZPL
Gunicorn	27.0.0	2026-11-10; 2 days ago	MIT
Pylons	1.0.2	2015-07-22; 11 years ago	BSD
Pyramid	2.1	2026-03-11; 8 months ago	BSD
Tornado	6.6.1	2026-11-09; 3 days ago	Apache
TurboGears	2.5.1	2026-10-12; 31 days ago	MIT, LGPL
web2py	3.1.1	2025-12-19; 10 months ago	LGPL3
Zope 2	5.13	2025-03-18; 19 months ago	ZPL

=== Ruby ===
Project	Current stable version	Release date	License
Padrino	0.14.4	2019-01-14	MIT
Ruby on Rails	8.1.3	2026-03-24; 7 months ago	MIT
Sinatra	4.2.1	2025-10-10; 13 months ago	MIT

=== Scala ===
Project	Current stable version	Release date	License
Lift	3.4.3	2020-11-28	Apache 2.0
Play	2.8.8	2021-04-08	Apache 2.0
Scalatra	2.8.1	2021-09-25	BSD

=== Others ===
Project	Language	Current stable version	Release date	License
AIDA/Web	Smalltalk	6.7	2014-09-14	MIT
Oracle APEX	PL/SQL	22.2	2022-11-10	Proprietary freeware
Flex	ActionScript, MXML	4.16.1	2019-11-23	Apache
Grails	Groovy (JVM)	6.2.2	2024-11-20	Apache
Morfik	C#, BASIC, Pascal, Java	3.0.8.1	2010-12-13	Proprietary freeware
Opa	Opa	1.1.1	2013-04-16	MIT and AGPL
OpenACS	Tcl	5.10.1	2024-09-03	GPL
Rocket	Rust	0.5.1	2024-05-23	MIT or Apache
Tokio	Rust	1.48.0	2025-10-14	MIT
Seaside	Smalltalk	3.5.9	2024-10-20	MIT

== Comparison of features ==
=== C++ ===
Project	Ajax	MVC framework	MVC push-pull	i18n & L10n?	ORM	Testing framework(s)	DB migration framework(s)	Security framework(s)	Template framework(s)	Caching framework(s)	Form validation framework(s)
Wt	Yes	Yes	Push & Pull	Yes	Wt::Dbo	Boost.test		Yes	Yes	No	Yes

=== ColdFusion Markup Language (CFML) ===
Project	Ajax	MVC framework	MVC push-pull	i18n & L10n?	ORM	Testing framework(s)	DB migration framework(s)	Security framework(s)	Template framework(s)	Caching framework(s)	Form validation framework(s)
ColdBox Platform	Yes	Yes	Push-pull	Yes	Quick & cbORM	Yes via TestBox	Yes	Yes	CFML	Yes	Yes

=== Java ===
Project	Language	Ajax	MVC framework	MVC push-pull	i18n & L10n?	ORM	Testing framework(s)	DB migration framework(s)	Security framework(s)	Template framework(s)	Caching framework(s)	Form validation framework(s)
Apache Click	Java	jQuery	Page oriented	Pull	Yes	Hibernate, Cayenne	Yes		pluggable	Velocity, JSP	Cached templates	Built-in validation
Apache OFBiz	Java, Groovy, XML,	jQuery	Yes	Push-pull	Yes	Entity Engine (Internal kind of ORM, not really ORM, notably used by Atlassian Jira)	JUnit	Entity Engine Tools, Data File Tool, CSV Parser, Apache POI	Internal Security framework based on OWASP	Freemarker (Recommended), Velocity (Support Available), JSP (Support Available)	Internal Cache Maintenance with Distributed Cache Clearing for clusters	Server side validation, Client Side Validation (JQuery)
Apache Sling	Java	Yes	Yes	Push-pull		Uses JCR content repository			Yes	Yes	Yes	
Apache Struts	Java	Yes	Yes	Push-pull	Yes	Yes	Unit tests			Yes		Yes
Apache Tapestry	Java	Prototype, jQuery	Yes	Pull	Yes	JPA, Hibernate, Cayenne	Selenium, TestNG, JUnit		Spring Security, Shiro	Yes	with extensions	Native or Bean Validation
Apache Wicket	Java	Extensions for YUI, ExtJS, more	No (Modular event-driven)	Pull	Yes	with extensions	Mock objects, unit and integration tests via extension		Yes	Yes	Yes	Yes
Grails	Groovy	Yes	Yes	Push	Yes	GORM, Hibernate	Unit tests, integration test, functional test	multiple plugins: autobase, dbmigrate, more	Spring Security, Apache Shiro	Yes	Yes	Yes
JavaServer Faces	Java	Yes	Yes	Pull	Yes	JPA, Hibernate and any other Java EE ORM framework	JUnit		Yes	Facelets, JSP	Yes	Native validators, integration with Bean Validation
Project	Language	Ajax	MVC framework	MVC push-pull	i18n & L10n?	ORM	Testing framework(s)	DB migration framework(s)	Security framework(s)	Template framework(s)	Caching framework(s)	Form validation framework(s)
JBoss Seam	Java	Yes	Yes	Pull	Yes	JPA, Hibernate	JUnit, TestNG		JAAS integration, Drools, Hibernate Filters, OpenID, CAPTCHA	Facelets	JBoss Cache, Ehcache	Hibernate Validator
JWt	Java	Yes	Yes	Push-pull	Yes				Yes	Yes		Yes
Play	Java, Scala	Yes	Yes	Push-pull	Yes	JPA, Hibernate	JUnit, Selenium	Yes	via Core Security module	Yes	Yes	Server-side validation
Spring	Java	Yes	Yes	Push	Yes	Hibernate, iBatis, more	Mock objects, unit tests		Spring Security (formerly Acegi)	JSP, Commons Tiles, Velocity, Thymeleaf, more	Ehcache, more	Commons validator, Bean Validation
Stripes	Java	Yes	Yes	Pull	Yes	JPA, Hibernate	Yes		framework extension	Yes		Yes
Vaadin	Java	GWT		Push-pull	Yes	Yes	Yes			Yes		Yes
Wavemaker	JavaScript (client), Java (server)	Dojo Toolkit	Yes	Push	Dojo Toolkit	Hibernate	JUnit	Hibernate	Spring Security (formerly Acegi), role-based access control	Dojo Toolkit	Dojo Toolkit	Regular expression, schema-driven validation
Project	Language	Ajax	MVC framework	MVC push-pull	i18n & L10n?	ORM	Testing framework(s)	DB migration framework(s)	Security framework(s)	Template framework(s)	Caching framework(s)	Form validation framework(s)
WebObjects	Java	Yes	Yes	Push-pull	Yes	EOF	WOUnit (JUnit), TestNG, Selenium	in Project WONDER		Yes	Yes	Yes
Google Web Toolkit	Java, JavaScript	Yes			Yes	JPA with RequestFactory	JUnit (too early), jsUnit (too difficult), Selenium (best)	via Java	Yes			Bean Validation
ZK	Java, ZUML	jQuery	Yes	Push-pull	Yes	any J2EE ORM framework	JUnit, ZATS	HibernateUtil, SpringUtil	Spring Security	Macro components & composition	Yes	client, server

=== JavaScript ===
Project	Ajax	MVC framework	MVC push-pull	i18n & L10n?	ORM	Testing framework(s)	DB migration framework(s)	Security framework(s)	Template framework(s)	Caching framework(s)	Form validation framework(s)
Analog	Yes via Angular	Yes	Unknown	Unknown	Unknown	Unknown	Unknown	Unknown	Unknown	Unknown	Unknown
Express.js	—N/a	—N/a	—N/a	—N/a	—N/a	—N/a	—N/a	—N/a	—N/a	—N/a	—N/a
Fastify	—N/a	—N/a	—N/a	—N/a	—N/a	—N/a	—N/a	—N/a	—N/a	—N/a	—N/a
Meteor	—N/a	—N/a	—N/a	—N/a	MongoDB	—N/a	—N/a	—N/a	—N/a	—N/a	—N/a
NestJS	—N/a	—N/a	—N/a	—N/a	—N/a	—N/a	—N/a	—N/a	—N/a	—N/a	—N/a
Next.js	Yes via React	Partial via Flux	No	Unknown	Unknown	Unknown	Unknown	Unknown	Unknown	Unknown	Unknown
Nuxt	Yes via Vue.js	Yes	Unknown	Unknown	Unknown	Yes via Vue.js	Unknown	Unknown	Yes via Vue.js	Unknown	Unknown
Remix	Yes via React	Partial via Flux	No	Unknown	Unknown	Unknown	Unknown	Unknown	Unknown	Unknown	Unknown
Sails.js	Yes	Yes	Unknown	Unknown	Yes	Unknown	Unknown	Unknown	Unknown	Unknown	Unknown
SvelteKit	Yes via Svelte	Yes	Unknown	Unknown	Unknown	Unknown	Unknown	Unknown	Yes via Svelte	Unknown	Unknown

=== Perl ===
Project	Ajax	MVC framework	MVC push-pull	i18n & L10n?	ORM	Testing framework(s)	DB migration framework(s)	Security framework(s)	Template framework(s)	Caching framework(s)	Form validation framework(s)
Catalyst	Toolkit-independent (REST & JSON support, specific plugins for Prototype JavaScript Framework, more)	Yes	Push in its most common usage	Yes	DBIx::Class, Rose::DB::Object, more	Supports Perl testing standards, Test Anything Protocol (TAP)	?	ACL-based, external engines, more	Template::Toolkit, HTML::Template, HTML::Mason, PHP and any extant Perl template engine	Cache, Memcached, shared memory, more	HTML::FormHandler HTML::FormFu, HTML::FormValidator, more
Dancer	Yes	Yes	Push	Yes	DBIx::Class, ORMesque	Yes	?	?	Template::Toolkit, HTML::Mason, Text::MicroTemplate, any extant Perl template engine	Cache, Memcached, shared memory, more	DataFu, any extant Perl form validation software
Mojolicious	Toolkit-independent (REST & JSON support)	No explicit model support though commonly used as MVC	Push	Yes	Commonly used with DBIx::Class	Test::Mojo	?	Signed session cookie	Built-in Perl templating, Template::Toolkit and several others via plugins	?	Not explicitly, use any Perl Modules

=== PHP ===
Project	PHP version	Ajax	MVC framework	MVC push-pull	i18n & L10n?	ORM	Testing framework(s)	DB migration framework(s)	Security framework(s)	Template framework(s)	Caching framework(s)	Form validation framework(s)	Scaffolding	RAD	Mobility
CakePHP	≥ 8.2	Any	Yes	Yes, Push & Cells	Yes	ORM, Data Mapper Pattern, SQL Relational Algebra Abstraction Layer	Unit tests, object mocking, fixtures, code coverage, memory analysis with PHPUnit and Xdebug and Continuous Integration via Travis	Yes	CRUD based, ACL-based, Multiple Plugins	Themes, Layouts, Cells, Views, Elements, Plugins for Twig, Bootstrap, etc.	Memcache, Redis, XCache, APC, File	Validation via Contexts (Table (DAO), Entity (VO) & Controller), CSRF Protection	Plugin CRUD	Cake Bake	Mobile Agent Detection, Layouts
CodeIgniter	≥ 8.1	Any	Yes	Push	Mostly	Third party only	Ready for next release, Unit tests for v.4 and up	Yes	Yes	Yes	Yes	Yes	No	Yes	Templates
Fat-Free Framework	≥ 5.4	Any	MVC, RMR	Push-pull	Yes	Data mappers for SQL, MongoDB, Flat-File	Built-in	Yes	Yes	Yes	APC, Memcache, XCache, WinCache, and Filesystem	Yes	No	?	?
FuelPHP	≥ 5.3.3	Yes	MVC, HMVC	Push	Yes	Yes	PHPUnit	Yes	Yes, Plugins available	Yes, Plugins available	File, Redis, Memcache, more	Yes	Yes	?	?
Gyroscope	≥ 5.4	nano.js, replaceable	LCHH	Push-pull	Mostly	Data-source agnostic	No	Built-in Schema comparison tool and UDF editor	ACL-based, replaceable	Implementation-specific; helper functions and theme templates available	APC, Memcache	Yes	Interactive code generator	Yes	Dedicated mobile and tablet layouts, landscape-portrait transformation
Laminas (formerly Zend Framework)	≥ 7.3	Toolkit-independent	Yes	Push-pull	Yes	Table and row data gateway or Doctrine	Unit tests, PHP Unit or other independent	Yes	ACL-based	Yes	APC, Database, File, Memcache, Zend Platform	Yes	Yes	?	?
Laravel	≥ 8.0	Any	Yes	Push	Yes	Eloquent	PHPUnit	Yes	Yes	Yes	APC, Database, File, Memcache, Redis	Yes	Yes	Yes	Yes
Li3 (Lithium)	≥ 8.0	Any	Yes	Push	Yes	Yes	Unit tests, builtin test framework or other independent	No	Yes, Plugins available	PHP, Twig Plugin available	Memcache, Redis, XCache, APC, File	Yes, with CSRF Protection and Form Signing	No	Yes	?
Phalcon	≥ 8.0	Any	Yes	Push	Yes	Yes	Codeception PHPUnit	Yes	Yes	Volt, PHP	APC, Memcache, Memory, Redis, Redis Cluster, File	Yes	Yes	Yes	?
Pop PHP	≥ 8.4	Any	Yes	Push	Yes	Yes	PHPUnit, PHPStan with CI via GitHub Actions	Yes	ACL-based	Yes	APC, Database, File, Memcache, Redis, Session	Yes	Yes	Yes	?
PRADO	≥ 7.3	Prototype, script.aculo.us, own components	No	Push-pull	Yes	Data access objects (DAO), active record pattern, SQLMap data mapper	PHPUnit, SimpleTest, Selenium	No	Yes	XML-based, similar to ASP.NETs	APC, Database, eAccelerator, Memcached, XCache	Yes	Yes	?	?
SilverStripe (Sapphire)	≥ 7.1	jQuery, jQuery UI	Yes	Push-pull	Yes	Active record pattern	Unit tests, Selenium	Automatic	incl. OpenID	Themes	Yes	Yes	Yes	Yes	Yes
Smart.Framework	≥ 7.4	Yes	Yes	Yes	Yes	Yes (PostgreSQL, MySQL, SQLite, MongoDB, Solr, others via plugins)	Yes	No	Yes	Yes (Markers, Twig, others via plugins)	Yes (File, Redis, others via plugins)	Yes	No	Yes	Yes, (jQuery mobile, Bootstrap, others via plugins)
Symfony	≥ 8.1	Prototype, script.aculo.us, Unobtrusive Ajax with UJS and PJS plugins	Yes	Push	Yes	Propel, Doctrine (YAML)	Yes	Plugin exists (alpha code)	Plugin	PHP, Twig	Yes	Yes	Yes	?	?
TYPO3	≥ 7.2	Any	Yes	Push-pull	Yes	Yes	Yes	Partial	Yes	TYPO3 Fluid	Yes	Yes	Plugin exists	Plugin exists	?
Yii	≥ 5.4	jQuery, jQuery UI, own components, plugins	Yes	Push-pull	Yes	Data Access Objects (DAO), Active Record Pattern, Plugins (incl. Doctrine 2.0)	PHPUnit, Selenium	Yes	ACL-based, RBAC-based, plugins	PHP-based, PRADO-like, plugins	APC, Database, eAccelerator, File, Memcache, Redis, WinCache, XCache, Zend Platform	Yes	Yes	?	?

=== Python ===
Project	Language	Ajax	MVC framework	MVC push-pull	i18n & L10n?	ORM	Testing framework(s)	DB migration framework(s)	Security framework(s)	Template framework(s)	Caching framework(s)	Form validation framework(s)	Python 3.*
CherryPy	Python	—	—	—	—	pluggable	—	—	—	pluggable	—	—	Yes
Django	Python	Yes	Yes	Push	Yes	Yes	Yes	Yes	Yes	built-in, Jinja2, Mako, Cheetah	Yes	Yes	Yes
FastAPI	Python	Yes	—	—	—	ORM-agnostic	via pytest	depends on ORM	Yes	Jinja2	—	Yes	Yes
Flask	Python	Yes	—	—	Yes	ORM-agnostic	via unittest	depends on ORM	Yes	Jinja2	Yes	Yes	Yes
Pylons	Python	helpers for Prototype and script.aculo.us	controller	Push	Yes	ORM-agnostic	via nose	depends on ORM		pluggable: Mako, Genshi, Myghty, Kid, more	native: pluggable: Redis, Beaker (memory, memcached, file, databases)	preferred formencode	No
Pyramid	Python	Yes	Yes	Push	Yes	ORM-agnostic	Yes	depends on ORM	Yes	pluggable: Jinja2, Chameleon, Mako, Genshi, more	default: native session factory. pluggable: Redis, PyNaCl, Beaker (memory, memcached, file, databases), more	deform, formencode, WTForms, more	Yes
Tornado	Python	See Advanced Async Example implements AJAX	—	—	—	—	—	—	—	—	—	—	Yes
TurboGears	Python	Toolkit-independent, provides support via JSON	Full stack, best-of-breed based	Push	Yes	SQLAlchemy	nose	SQLAlchemy-Migrate	Repoze.what & Repoze.who	pluggable: Genshi, more	Support for memcached, and any WSGI compliant system	ToscaWidgets, utilizing FormEncode	Yes
web2py	Python	Yes	Yes	Push	Yes	Yes	Yes	Yes	Yes	Yes	Yes	Yes	Yes
BlueBream (Zope 3)	Python	via add-on products, e.g. Plone w/KSS	Yes	Pull	Yes	ZODB, SQLObject, SQLAlchemy	Unit tests, functional tests	ZODB generations	ACL-based	Yes	Yes	Yes	No
Zope 2	Python		Yes	Pull	Yes	ZODB, SQLObject, SQLAlchemy	Unit tests		ACL-based	Yes	Yes	CMFFormController	No

=== Ruby ===
Project	Ajax	MVC framework	MVC push-pull	i18n & L10n?	ORM	Testing framework(s)	DB migration framework(s)	Security framework(s)	Template framework(s)	Caching framework(s)	Form validation framework(s)
Ruby on Rails	Prototype, script.aculo.us, jQuery	ActiveRecord, Action Pack	Push	Yes	ActiveRecord	Unit Tests, Functional Tests and Integration Tests	Yes	Plug-in	Yes	Yes	Yes
Sinatra	No	Yes	Push	No	ORM-independent	rack-test	Yes	through Rack middleware	Yes	through Rack middleware	No

=== Others ===
Project	Language	Ajax	MVC framework	MVC push-pull	i18n & L10n?	ORM	Testing framework(s)	DB migration framework(s)	Security framework(s)	Template framework(s)	Caching framework(s)	Form validation framework(s)
AIDA/Web	Smalltalk	Yes	Yes		Yes	Gemstone/S, GLORP, more	SUnit		Yes			Yes
Application Express	PL/SQL	Yes			Yes			Yes	Yes			Yes
Flex	ActionScript, MXML	Not by name but similar technology					FlexUnit					
Lift	Scala	Yes	Yes	Pull	Yes	Yes	ScalaTest, Selenium	Yes	Yes	Yes	Yes	Yes
Opa	Opa	Yes			Yes	MongoDB			Yes	Yes	Yes	
OpenACS	Tcl	Yes	Yes		Yes	Yes	Yes	Yes	Yes	Yes	Yes	Yes
Seaside	Smalltalk	jQuery, jQuery UI, Prototype JavaScript Framework, script.aculo.us, more	Yes		Yes	GLORP, Gemstone/S, more	Unit tests, SUnit			No, intentionally		Magritte
Project	Language	Ajax	MVC framework	MVC push-pull	i18n & L10n?	ORM	Testing framework(s)	DB migration framework(s)	Security framework(s)	Template framework(s)	Caching framework(s)	Form validation framework(s)

== See also ==
Lists of frameworks for frontend development:

- Comparison of JavaScript-based web frameworks
- CSS framework

Other:

- Common Gateway Interface, used before web frameworks
- Comparison of shopping cart software
- Content management system
- Dynamic web page
- Java view technologies and frameworks
- List of content management systems
- List of rich web application frameworks
- List of web service frameworks
