= NestJS =

JavaScript framework

- Original author: Kamil Myśliwiec
- Developers: Kamil Myśliwiec, NestJS core team and others
- Release: February 26, 2017; 9 years ago
- Stable release: 12.1.1 / September 28, 2026; 15 days ago
- Written in: TypeScript
- Platform: Node.js
- Type: Web framework
- License: MIT License
- Website: nestjs.com
- Repository: github.com/nestjs/nest

NestJS, or simply Nest, is a server-side Node.js-based web framework, released as free and open-source software under an MIT License.

== History ==
In February 2017, Kamil Myśliwiec was inspired by Angular to build a Node.js-based framework with an architecture based on Socket.IO and Express. According to the NestJS GitHub repository, the first tagged release, version 4.4.0, was on November 23, 2017.

Over the following years, the framework broadened its functionality, adding support for additional adapters and drivers, such as Fastify, to provide more options for developers. It also introduced integration with popular message brokers, including RabbitMQ and Kafka, to facilitate communication in distributed systems.

== Features ==
NestJS offers several features for handling requests and responses. Middleware are based on Express, and are executed before the route handler. Guards are used to control access to routes by determining whether a request meets specific conditions. Interceptors allow additional logic to be executed before or after method execution. An interceptor should implement the intercept method of NestInterceptor.

== Popularity ==
NestJS is used by Sanofi, Adidas, Autodesk, Mercedes-Benz, GitLab, Red Hat, BMW, Roche, IBM, Decathlon, Société Générale, JetBrains, TotalEnergies, Capgemini, REWE digital and others.

== See also ==
- Comparison of server-side web frameworks § JavaScript
