= Sails.js =

Open-source web framework built on Node.js

- Sails.js brand logo
- Developer(s): Mike McNeil and others
- Initial release: 2012; 13 years ago
- Stable release: 1.5.11 / May 24, 2024; 9 months ago
- Repository: Sails.js Repository
- Written in: JavaScript
- Operating system: Cross-platform
- Platform: Node.js
- Type: Web framework
- License: MIT License
- Website: sailsjs.com

Sails.js (or Sails) is a model–view–controller (MVC) web application framework developed atop the Node.js environment, released as free and open-source software under the MIT License. It is designed for Node.js web applications and APIs with similar architecture to Ruby on Rails.

== Features ==
Sails.js is built on Node.js and Express.js, enabling applications to be written in JavaScript. This includes models, views, controllers, configuration files, and adapters (e.g., database). Similar to Ruby on Rails, Sails.js provides an object-relational mapping interface using Waterline.js, which abstracts the database interaction layer.

A number of other packages are included to enable fast auto-generated REST APIs, WebSockets by default using Socket.io; and compatibility features making it front-end agnostic (AngularJS, React.js, Android, iOS, etc.).

== See also ==
- JavaScript framework
- JavaScript library
