= Gyroscope (disambiguation) =

A gyroscope is a device for measuring or maintaining orientation, based on the principle of conservation of angular momentum.

Gyroscope may also refer to:

- Ring laser gyroscope, uses ring lasers
- Fibre optic gyroscope, uses fibre optics and light interference
- Rate integrating gyroscope, a type of rate gyro
- Vibrating structure gyroscope, functions much like the halteres of an insect
- Gyroscope (automobile), an American brass era car 1908–1909
- "Gyroscope" (software), a web framework written in PHP and JavaScript
- Gyroscope (video game), a video game published by Melbourne House
- Operation Gyroscope, a program by the US military

== Music ==
- Gyroscope (band), a post-grunge rock band from Perth, Western Australia

=== Songs ===
- "Gyroscope" (song), a promotional single and song from the album Transmission by The Tea Party
- "Gyroscope", a song from the album Whoracle by In Flames
- "Gyroscope", a song from the album Emergency & I by The Dismemberment Plan
- "Gyroscope", a song from the album Geogaddi by Boards of Canada
