= Dancer (software) =

Web framework

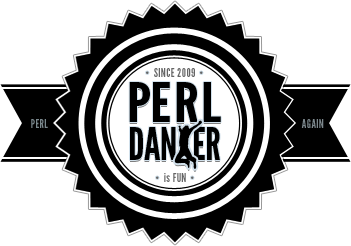
- Original author: Alexis Sukrieh
- Initial release: July 27, 2009
- Stable release: 1.1.1 / 2024-07-18[±]
- Repository: github.com/PerlDancer/Dancer2
- Written in: Perl
- Operating system: Cross-platform
- Type: Web application framework
- License: GPL and PAL
- Website: perldancer.org

Dancer is an open source lightweight web application framework written in Perl and inspired by Ruby's Sinatra.

In April 2011, Dancer was rewritten from scratch and released as Dancer2. The reason for the rewrite was to fix architectural issues and eliminate the use of singletons. Development of Dancer1 was at first frozen, but was later continued to maintain backward compatibility for existing apps.

Dancer is developed through GitHub, with stable releases available via CPAN. Dancer2 is released as a separate module.

== Example ==
#!/usr/bin/env perl
use Dancer2;

get '/hello/:name' => sub {
    return "Why, hello there " . route_parameters->get('name');
};

get '/redirectMeTo/:trgval' => sub {
    redirect '/' . route_parameters->get('trgval');
};

start;

== Features ==
=== Out-of-box ===
Unlike other frameworks such as Catalyst, Dancer only requires a handful of CPAN modules and is very self-contained.

=== Standalone development server ===
Dancer includes a standalone development server that can be used for developing and testing applications.

=== PSGI / Plack support ===
Dancer supports the PSGI specification, and can thus be run on any compliant PSGI server, including Plack, uWSGI or Mongrel 2.

=== Abstracted ===
Since most parts of Dancer are abstracted and has a plugin architecture, extending Dancer is fairly straightforward, and a thriving community has sprung up around building these extensions.

Dancer features a lightweight object system, exception throwing similar to Try::Tiny, and is fast, especially in CGI environments.

== See also ==
- Comparison of web frameworks
