= Fat-Free Framework =

PHP web application framework

- Developer: F3::Factory / Bong Cosca
- Stable release: 3.9.0 / 2024-12-29[±]
- Repository: Fat-Free Repository
- Written in: PHP 5.4+
- Operating system: Cross-platform
- Size: ~83 KB
- Type: Web framework
- License: GNU General Public License
- Website: fatfreeframework.com

Fat-Free Framework is an open-source web framework distributed under the GNU General Public License and hosted on GitHub and SourceForge. The software seeks to combine a full featureset with a lightweight code base while being easy to learn, use and extend.

The source code (~83 KB) is written almost entirely in PHP and engineered specifically with user experience and usability as its primary design goals.

Commonly called F3 by PHP developers, Fat-Free was released as free software in 2009. Its general architecture was influenced by Ruby's Sinatra. The lightweight code base is controlled and maintained by a small core team, with additional functionality and funding contributions coming from various enterprises and user groups, who also help guide its future direction.

The base feature set includes a URL router, cache engine, and support for multilingual applications. Fat-Free also has a number of plug-ins that extend its functionality as well as data mappers for SQL and NoSQL database back-ends: SQLite, MySQL, PostgreSQL, MSSQL, Sybase, DB2, MongoDB, CouchDB, and Flat File.

The core functionality is accompanied by a number of optional plug-ins, among them a template engine, a Unit testing toolkit, Database-managed sessions, Markdown-to-HTML converter, Atom/RSS feed reader, Image processor, Geodata handler, a Basket/Shopping cart application and data validation.

== See also ==
- Comparison of web frameworks
- Laravel
