= Fastify =

JavaScript framework

- Original authors: Matteo Collina; Tomas Della Vedova
- Developers: Platformatic, OpenJS and others
- Release: September 2016; 9 years ago
- Stable release: 5.8.5 / April 14, 2026; 2 months ago
- Written in: JavaScript
- Platform: Node.js
- Type: Web framework
- License: MIT License
- Website: fastify.dev
- Repository: github.com/fastify/fastify

Fastify is a performance-oriented backend web framework for Node.js, released as free and open-source software under an MIT License. Its development was inspired by Hapi and Express.

As a lightweight alternative to other Node.js web API frameworks, benchmarks reveal it to be significantly faster.

== History ==
Fastify was first conceived by Matteo Collina in 2015, and created together with Tomas Della Vedova in September 2016. According to GitHub, the initial release of Fastify was version 0.1.0 on October 17, 2016.

Building upon the technical foundations of Fastify, Collina and Luca Maraschi created Platformatic in 2022, to support a "batteries-included" developer experience for building APIs (REST/OpenAPI or GraphQL).

In 2023, Accelerating Server-Side Development with Fastify, a comprehensive guide authored by Fastify core contributors, was published.

Some users of Fastify include Capital One, Walmart, American Express.

== See also ==
- Comparison of server-side web frameworks § JavaScript
- Socket.IO
