= YII =

YII may refer to:

- Factor XII, a plasma protein
- Yii, a web application framework
- yii, ISO 639-3 code of the Yidiny language
- Young Inventors International
