= Java view technologies and frameworks =

Programming language and libraries

Java view technologies and frameworks are web-based software libraries that provide the user interface, or "view-layer", of Java web applications. Such application frameworks are used for defining web pages and handling the HTTP requests (clicks) generated by those web pages. As a sub-category of web frameworks, view-layer frameworks often overlap to varying degrees with web frameworks that provide other functionality for Java web applications.

Java view-layer frameworks often claim to support some or all of the model–view–controller design pattern.

== At a glance ==
Action-based frameworks:	Apache Struts, Spring MVC
Component-based frameworks:	Apache Click, Apache Tapestry, Apache Wicket, Jakarta Faces
Web template systems:	Apache Tiles, SiteMesh, Thymeleaf

- Jakarta Faces (JSF), Apache Tapestry and Apache Wicket are competing component-based technologies, abstracting the stateless HTTP request-response cycle and the Jakarta Servlet API behind an object-oriented, event-driven component model.
- In contrast, Struts and the Spring MVC Framework are action-oriented frameworks that provide a thinner abstraction layer over the servlet API.
- Apache Tiles is a templating framework designed to work with Struts.
- Facelets is a view definition and templating technology designed to work with JSF.
- SiteMesh can be used with any Jakarta Pages (JSP).
- Facelets, Tapestry and Wicket have their own templating approaches based on HTML/XHTML.
- Apache Click uses HTML based Apache Velocity templates and plain old Java objects (POJOs), with JSP optional.

== Servlet API ==
The Servlet API is the foundation of almost all Java Web View technologies. Servlet provides the basic mechanism for writing Java classes for web applications. Servlets can respond to HTTP requests, create cookies and maintain sessions.

== Jakarta Pages (JSP) ==
- Built on top of the Servlet API, JSP provides a document-centric, tag-based templates, server programming model which can generate many forms of textual content.
- Java code may be embedded in JSP files and is compiled and executed when a request is received.

== Apache Struts ==
- Struts provides for a decoupling of the Controller and the View.
- Requests are received by a Java Class (Controller) which can decide which View to display.
- The actual View can be written in different view technologies, like JSP, free marker template, velocity template etc.
- An XML configuration file is used to specify the "Page Navigation", i.e. the flow of the request to the appropriate Controller, and which View to display based on the outcome of the Controller.
- Competitor: Spring MVC, Grails

== Apache Tapestry ==
- A component-based view framework.
- Classes are written as POJOs and byte-code transformed at runtime
- Configured with annotations and naming conventions rather than XML
- Compared to JSPs, enforces a clear separation of HTML markup and Java code.
- HTML templates can be directly previewed by web designers
- Changed component classes are live-reloaded into running application for faster development.
- Uses the Post/Redirect/Get navigation pattern for form submission.
- Competitor: Wicket, JSF

== Apache Tiles ==
- This is an HTML templating framework based on the composite pattern.
- It allows for the HTML page to be broken up into multiple "pagelets", called Templates, Definitions and Composing pages.
- At runtime the pagelets are stitched together to generate the final HTML. Pages are written in JSP.
- Competitor: SiteMesh

== Apache Wicket ==
- A component-based view framework.
- Pages directly interact with stateful Java components on the server.
- Components and their state are managed by the Wicket framework, freeing the application developer from having to use HttpSession directly to manage state.
- Does not require XML for configuration.
- Compared to JSPs, enforces a clear separation of HTML markup and Java code.
- Web page components are 'pushed' into the HTML markup from the code.
- Competitor: Tapestry, JSF

== Jakarta Faces and Facelets ==
- A specification for component-based view frameworks.
- Eclipse Mojarra and Apache MyFaces implementations are available
- Typically uses Facelets for XML/XHTML-based templating.
- Classes are written as POJOs, with Annotations or XML configuration files used to associate them with page and component templates.
- The Unified Expression Language allows binding component fields and events to POJO bean properties and methods.
- Conversion and validation constraints can be specified in Facelets and are automatically applied, normally resulting in reposting of the same page with error information in case of failure.
- Navigation can be via configuration file rules or directly specified in the page.
- Can transparently support Ajax.
- Competitor: Wicket, Tapestry

== SiteMesh ==
- SiteMesh is an HTML templating framework based on the "Decoration" model.
- It allows for the creation of a 'decoration' template which is then applied to any other HTML to generate a new HTML.
- The newly generated HTML contains elements from the original HTML blended into the template.
- This allows for the original HTML to be very simple and devoid of any formatting or layout specification. The template, in turn, is devoid of any actual information.
- Blending the two allows for a consistent look and feel for all web pages.
- Competitor: Tiles

== Spark ==
- Spark a micro web framework built around a simple routing system
- It runs on an embedded Jetty web server by default, but can be configured to run on other webservers.
- It supports three different templates engines: Velocity, FreeMarker and Mustache
- It aims to facilitate rapid development, and does not make use of annotations or proprietary solutions.

== See also ==
- List of web service frameworks
- List of Java frameworks
