= JSGI =

Interface between web servers and JavaScript-based web applications

JSGI, or JavaScript Gateway Interface, is an interface between web servers and JavaScript-based web applications and frameworks. It was inspired by the Rack for Ruby and WSGI for Python and was one of the inspirations of PSGI for Perl.

is a reference implementation of JSGI.

It has been included in and further developed by the CommonJS project.

== JSGI packages ==
All these packages are for Node.js.

=== Low level ===
- Q-IO: Promise-based I/O, includes JSGI-based HTTP server and client
- jsgi-node: Low level JSGI interface for Node.JS

=== Framework ===
These frameworks allow using promises with Q:

- joey on GitHub
- bogart on GitHub

The names are inspired by Sinatra.
