= PRADO (framework) =

Web framework for PHP

- Developer(s): PRADO Group
- Initial release: September 1, 2004
- Stable release: 4.3.1 / 2025-05-21[±]
- Repository: Prado Repository
- Written in: PHP
- Operating system: Cross-platform
- Type: Web framework
- License: Modified BSD License
- Website: www.pradoframework.net

PRADO is an open source, object-oriented, event-driven, component-based PHP web framework. PRADO is used for the development of interactive web pages and applications. In 2013, it was considered by Computer Science educators to be one of the top six PHP web frameworks.

== History ==
PRADO's name is an acronym derived from "PHP Rapid Application Development Object-oriented". The PRADO project was started by Qiang Xue and was inspired by Apache Tapestry. The framework also borrowed ideas from Borland Delphi and Microsoft's ASP.NET framework. The first public release of PRADO came out in June 2004, but was written using the very limited and now outdated PHP 4 object model, which caused many problems. Qiang re-wrote the framework for the new PHP 5 object model, and won the Zend PHP 5 coding contest with it.

PRADO is a rapid application development (RAD) framework, and in its infancy was criticized as not yet ready for high-performance, high-traffic scenarios. Implementations of template and configuration caching in later PRADO releases eliminated some performance bottlenecks in its architecture, increasing its suitability for medium- to high-traffic websites.

In 2008, PRADO was succeeded by the Yii framework, a conceptual redesign of PRADO targeted to high-traffic scenarios.
