= Apache Shale =

Web application framework

- Developer: Apache Software Foundation
- Final release: 1.0.4 / December 19, 2007; 18 years ago
- Written in: Java
- Operating system: Cross-platform
- Type: Web framework
- License: Apache License 2.0
- Website: shale.apache.org
- Repository: svn.apache.org/repos/asf/shale/

Shale was a web application framework maintained by the Apache Software Foundation. It is fundamentally based on JavaServer Faces. As of May 2009 Apache Shale has been retired and moved to the Apache Attic.

== See also ==
- Apache Struts
