= Mojolicious =

Internet application framework

- Original author: Sebastian Riedel
- Initial release: September 24, 2008; 17 years ago
- Stable release: 9.37 / 2024-05-13[±]
- Repository: Mojolicious Repository
- Written in: Perl
- Type: Web application framework
- License: PAL
- Website: mojolicious.org

Mojolicious is a real-time web application framework, written by Sebastian Riedel, creator of the web application framework Catalyst. Licensed as free software under the Artistic License v 2.0, it is written in the Perl programming language, and is designed for use in both simple and complex web applications, based on Riedel's previous experience developing Catalyst. Documentation for the framework was partly funded by a grant from The Perl Foundation.

As it is written in Perl, Mojolicious can run on any of the many operating systems for which Perl is available, and can be installed directly from CPAN. Prebuilt packages of Mojolicious are also available for NetBSD from pkgsrc and for Microsoft Windows and other operating systems from ActiveState's Perl package manager.

== Features ==
- Real-time web framework supporting a simplified single file mode through Mojolicious::Lite.
- Out-of-the-box support for RESTful routes, plugins, Perl-ish templates, session management, signed cookies, testing framework, static file server and full Unicode support.
- Portable and object oriented Perl API with no requirements besides Perl 5.10.1 (although 5.18+ is recommended, and optional CPAN modules will be used to provide advanced functionality if they are installed).
- Full stack HTTP and WebSocket. Client/server implementation with IPv6, TLS, IDNA, Comet (long polling), chunking and multipart support.
- Built-in non-blocking I/O web server supporting libevent and hot deployment for embedding.
- Automatic CGI and PSGI detection.
- JSON and HTML5/XML parser with CSS3 selector support.
