= JWt (Java web toolkit) =

Software library

- Original author: Emweb
- Release: 1.0.0 / December 2005; 20 years ago
- Stable release: 4.14.0 / 2026-07-15; 18 days ago
- Written in: Java
- Operating system: Cross-platform
- Type: Web framework
- License: Dual License: GNU General Public License or Commercial License
- Website: www.webtoolkit.eu/jwt
- Repository: github.com/emweb/jwt

JWt (pronounced "jay-witty") is an open-source widget-centric web application framework for the Java programming language developed by Emweb. It has an API that uses established GUI application development patterns. The programming model is component-based and event-driven, similar to Swing.

The goal of the library is to benefit from the stateful component model used in desktop applications APIs, applied to web development, instead of the traditional model–view–controller (MVC) model. Rather than using MVC at the level of a page, MVC is pushed to the level of individual components.

While the library uses a desktop application development model, it does support web-specific features including semantic URLs, browser history navigation support, internationalization, themes, and styling.

A unique feature of the library is its abstraction layer of the browser rendering model. The library uses Ajax for communicating with Ajax-capable browsers, while using plain HTML form post-backs for other user agents (for accessibility and search engines). Using a progressive bootstrap method, the user interface is initially rendered as plain HTML, and for Ajax-capable browsers, it is automatically upgraded to use Ajax for increased interactivity.

JWt is distributed as a jar file. A JWt application is a war file that is deployed in a standards-compliant servlet container.

== Major features ==
See the feature list on the project homepage for a more detailed overview.

- Automatic graceful degradation and progressive enhancement
- On all modern browsers, a JWt application is a single-page application, with full support for forward/back and bookmark navigation, but still fully SEO.
- Supports server-initiated events (Comet), and uses asynchronous I/O when deployed within a Servlet 3.0 container.
- A unified 2D rendering API (SVG/HTML5 canvas/VML/PDF) with java.awt.Graphics2D compatibility
- Integrated PDF rendering for Widgets, Graphics (Charts) and HTML/CSS, to generate reports
- Both client-side and server-side validation
- Various automatic built-in security features to avoid cross-site scripting and CSRF vulnerabilities.
- Theme support through CSS or Bootstrap
- Available widgets are demonstrated in the widget gallery
- A 3D painting API for WebGL rendering, with fallback to server-side GPU accelerated rendering
- A 3D chart API (surfaces, points, bar charts, ...) supporting selection, intersection highlighting, height maps, isolines, ...

== Code example ==
The Hello World! example full source code

/*
 * A simple hello world application class which demonstrates how to react
 * to events, read input, and give feed-back.
 */
public class HelloApplication extends WApplication {
    public HelloApplication(WEnvironment env) {
        super(env);
      
        setTitle("Hello world");

        getRoot().addWidget(new WText("Your name, please ? "));
        final WLineEdit nameEdit = new WLineEdit(getRoot());
        nameEdit.setFocus();

        WPushButton button = new WPushButton("Greet me.", getRoot());
        button.setMargin(5, Side.Left);

        getRoot().addWidget(new WBreak());

        final WText greeting = new WText(getRoot());

        button.clicked().addListener(this, new Signal.Listener() {
            public void trigger() {
                greeting.setText("Hello there, " + nameEdit.getText());
            }
        });
  }
}

== See also ==
- Comparison of web frameworks
- Wt, the C++ project from which JWt is derived
