= Lift (web framework) =

Fast and secure web framework for Scala

- Original author: David Pollak
- Developer: Lift Team
- Release: 2007
- Stable release: 4.0.0 / 17 May 2026; 2 months ago
- Written in: Scala
- Operating system: Cross-platform
- Type: Web framework
- License: Apache License 2.0
- Website: liftweb.net
- Repository: github.com/lift/framework

Lift is a free and open-source web framework that is designed for the Scala programming language. It was originally created by David Pollak who was dissatisfied with certain aspects of the Ruby on Rails framework. Lift was launched as an open source project on 26 February 2007 under the Apache License 2.0. A commercially popular web platform often cited as being developed using Lift is Foursquare.

== Design goals and overview ==
Lift is an expressive framework for writing web applications. It draws upon concepts from peer frameworks such as Grails, Ruby on Rails, Seaside, Wicket and Django. It favors convention over configuration in the style of Ruby on Rails, although it does not prescribe the model–view–controller (MVC) architectural pattern. Rather, Lift is chiefly modeled upon the so-called "View First" (designer friendly) approach to web page development inspired by the Wicket framework. Lift is also designed to be a high-performance, scalable web framework by leveraging Scala actors to support more concurrent requests than is possible with a thread-per-request server.

As Scala program code executes within the Java virtual machine (JVM), any existing Java library and web container can be used in running Lift applications. Lift web applications are thus packaged as WAR files and deployed on any servlet 2.4 engine (for example, Tomcat 5.5.xx, Jetty 6.0, etc.). Lift programmers may use the standard Scala/Java development toolchain including IDEs such as Eclipse, NetBeans and IDEA. Dynamic web content is authored via templates using standard HTML5 or XHTML editors. Lift applications also benefit from native support for advanced web development techniques such as Comet and Ajax.

The main characteristics of Lift applications are:

- Resistant to common vulnerabilities including many of the OWASP.
- Fast to build, concise and easy to maintain.
- High performance and scale in the real world to handle big traffic levels.
- Interactive like a desktop application.

== History ==
The stable version 1.0 of Lift was released on 26 February 2009 (two years after initiation of the project). Lift 2.0 was released in June 2010. David Pollak, the original creator of Lift, discussed the release of Lift 2.0 on the popular FLOSS weekly podcast.

Lift reached five years of continuous development on 26 February 2012.
