= ColdBox Platform =

Web application framework

- Original author(s): Ortus Solutions, Corp
- Initial release: June 15, 2006
- Stable release: 7.3.0 / 2024-05-14[±]
- Repository: ColdBox Repository
- Written in: CFML, Java
- Type: Web application framework
- License: Apache License v2
- Website: ColdBox.org

ColdBox is a free, open-source, conventions-based, modular web application framework intended for building enterprise applications with ColdFusion (CFML) using a Hierarchical MVC approach.

It is a set of tools and methodologies that can allow a developer to build their web applications in a modern and secure way. It also provides them with a scaffold on which to base their applications. As a result, they don’t have to reinvent the wheel on most concerns they have to consider when building web applications. The framework gives developers the proper tooling to do their job quickly, securely, modularly, and flexibly.

The source code of ColdBox and its companion libraries are hosted on GitHub and licensed under the terms of the Apache License v2.

== History ==
ColdBox was developed and created by Luis F. Majano in 2006, and it has become the most widely used and maintained MVC framework. Given its speed and scalability, ColdBox evolved into a performant and simple framework that empowered developers. It became a professional open source project in 2008 when professional services were offered by the parent company Ortus Solutions, Corp. Later, in 2011, the Hierarchical Model View Controller was set as its core foundation design pattern. In the last few years, it introduced tight integration to Java's `CompletableFuture` API to support Futures and Promises and asynchronous/parallel programming.
