= Tornado (web server) =

Python web server and application framework

- Original author: FriendFeed
- Developers: Ben Darnell and FriendFeed engineering team
- Initial release: 2009; 17 years ago
- Stable release: 6.5.3 / 11 December 2025; 3 months ago
- Written in: Python
- Operating system: Cross-platform
- Available in: English
- Type: Web server
- License: Apache License 2.0
- Website: www.tornadoweb.org
- Repository: github.com/tornadoweb/tornado

Tornado is a scalable, non-blocking web server and web application framework written in Python. It was developed for use by FriendFeed; the company was acquired by Facebook in 2009 and Tornado was open-sourced soon after.

== Performance ==
Tornado is noted for its high performance. Its design enables handling a large number of concurrent connections (i.e., tries to solve the "C10k problem").

== Modules ==
- An asynchronous MongoDB driver called Motor.
- CouchDB drivers called corduroy and trombi.
- Asynchronous driver for PostgreSQL wrapping psycopg called Momoko

== Example ==
The following code shows a simple web application that displays "Hello World!" when visited:

import asyncio

import tornado.web

class MainHandler(tornado.web.RequestHandler):
    def get(self):
        self.write("Hello, world")

def make_app():
    return tornado.web.Application([(r"/", MainHandler),])

async def main():
    app = make_app()
    app.listen(8888)
    await asyncio.Event().wait()

if __name__ == "__main__":
    asyncio.run(main())

== See also ==
- Django (web framework)
- FastAPI
- Flask (web framework)
- Pylons project
- Web2py
- Comparison of web server software
