= Yii =

Web application framework

- Stable release: 3.0 / 2025-12-31[±]
- Written in: PHP
- Operating system: Cross-platform
- Type: Web application framework
- License: New BSD License
- Website: www.yiiframework.com
- Repository: YII Repository

Yii is an open source, object-oriented, component-based MVC PHP web application framework. Yii is pronounced as "Yee" or [ji:] and in Chinese it means "simple and evolutionary" and it can be an acronym for "Yes It Is!".

== History ==
Yii started as an attempt to fix perceived drawbacks of the PRADO framework: Slow handling of complex pages, steep learning curve and difficulty to customize many controls. In October 2006, after ten months of development, the first alpha version of Yii was released, followed by the formal 1.00 release in December 2008.

Yii 1.1 was released in January 2010 adding a form builder, relational Active record queries, a unit testing framework and more. The Yii community continues to follow the 1.1 branch with PHP7+ support and security fixes. The latest version 1.1.23 was released in December 2020.

In May 2011 the developers decided to use new PHP versions and fix architectural shortcomings, resulting in version 2.0. In May 2013 the Yii 2.0 code went public, followed by the first stable release in October 2014. PHP8 is supported since version 2.0.38. The latest version 2.0.51 was released in July 2024.

Yii 3.0 was released in December 2025. Yii3 works with the PHP ecosystem in depth. It integrates with any PHP library. Yii3 uses modern PHP standards enabling the leverage of the ecosystem's innovation. The central part of the framework is its dependency injection container. It brings all the individual packages together, automatically resolving dependencies and helping to obtain classes requested.

== Version history ==
Color	Meaning
Red	Old version; no longer supported
Yellow	Old version; still supported
Green	Current version
Blue	Future version

Version	Release date	End of active support	End of security/compatibility support	Requirement
1.0	December 3, 2008	December 31, 2010		PHP 5.1.0 or above
1.1	January 10, 2010	November 22, 2015	December 31, 2026	PHP 5.1.0 or above
2.0	October 12, 2014	30 May, 2024	23 November, 2027	PHP 7.4.0 or above
3.0	December 31, 2025	31 December, 2030	31 December, 2035	PHP 8.2.0 or above

== Extensions ==
The Yii project includes a repository of user-contributed extensions in addition to an official extension library, zii, which was merged with the core framework; it has been bundled in every release since Yii version 1.1.0 and includes additional widgets such as grids and jQuery UI.

== See also ==
- Active record pattern
- Comparison of web frameworks
- Model–view–controller
- Scaffold (programming)

== Bibliography ==
=== Books ===
- Merkel, Dirk (2010). "Chapter 6: PHP Frameworks". Expert PHP 5 Tools. Packt Publishing. ISBN 978-1-84719-838-9.
- Winesett, Jeffrey (2010). Agile Web Application Development with Yii1.1 and PHP5. Packt Publishing. ISBN 978-1-84719-958-4.
- Makarov, Alexander (2011). Yii 1.1 Application Development Cookbook. Packt Publishing. ISBN 978-1-84951-548-1.
- Ullman, Larry (2013). The Yii Book. Larry Ullman. Archived from the original on 2012-11-03.
- Winesett, Jeffrey (2012). Web Application Development with Yii and PHP. Packt Publishing. ISBN 978-1-84951-872-7.
- O'Meara, Lauren J.; Hamilton III, James R. (2012). Yii Rapid Application Development Hotshot. Packt Publishing. ISBN 978-1-84951-750-8.
- Макаров, Александр (2012). Yii. Сборник рецептов. ДМК Пресс. ISBN 978-5-94074-786-4.
- Sosna, Łukasz (2013). Yii Framework. Helion. ISBN 978-83-246-7920-1.
- Mumm, Jacob (2013). Instant Yii 1.1 Application Development Starter. Packt Publishing. ISBN 978-1-78216-168-4. Archived from the original on 2015-07-13.
- Uday, Sawant (2013). Instant Building Multi-Page Forms with Yii How-to. Packt Publishing. ISBN 978-1-78216-642-9. Archived from the original on 2015-07-13.
- Safronov, Mark (2014). Web Application Development with Yii 2 and PHP. Packt Publishing. ISBN 978-1-78398-188-5. Archived from the original on 2014-10-17.
- Portwood II, Charles R. (2014). Yii Project Blueprints. Packt Publishing. ISBN 978-1-78328-773-4. Archived from the original on 2014-10-17.
- Keck, Bill (2014). Yii 2 For Beginners. Leanpub.
- Pescarin, Matteo (2015). Learning Yii Testing. Packt Publishing. ISBN 978-1-78439-227-7. Archived from the original on 2015-07-13.
- Portwood II, Charles R. (2016). Mastering Yii. Packt Publishing. ISBN 978-1-78588-242-5. Archived from the original on 2016-03-09.
- Bogdanov, Andrew; Eliseev, Dmitry (2016). Yii2 Application Development Cookbook - Third Edition. Packt Publishing. ISBN 978-1-78528-176-1. Archived from the original on 2016-11-29.

=== Journals ===
- Behme, Henning (January 2009). "World Wide Web". IX. Heise.
- Winesett, Jeffrey (March 2009). "Adding the Yii Framework to Your Web Development Toolbox". PHP|architect.
- Winesett, Jeffrey (July 2009). "Yii: Flex Your Flash". PHP|architect.
- Kreußel, Peter (November 2009). "PHP-Frameworks im Überblick, Viel Holz für den Rahmen". Linux-Magazin. Linux New Media AG.
- Setter, Matthew (December 2010). "YiiLocal – Find Stuff Near You". PHP|architect.
- Moorjani, Philip (April 2014). "Introduction to Yii 2.0". PHP|architect.
