= Socket.IO =

Library for realtime web applications

- Original author: Guillermo Rauch
- Developer: Damien Arrachequesne
- Stable release: 4.7.5 / 14 March 2024; 2 years ago
- Written in: JavaScript
- Operating system: Cross-platform
- Type: Event-driven networking
- License: MIT License
- Website: socket.io
- Repository: github.com/socketio/socket.io

Socket.IO is an event-driven library for real-time web applications. It enables real-time, bi-directional communication between web clients and servers. It consists of two components: a client, and a server. Both components have a nearly identical API.

Socket.IO is also a protocol, where different complying implementations of the protocol can communicate with each other. The main implementation consists of two parts: a client that runs in the browser and a server for Node.js. Apart from the main implementation, there are multiple implementations, for example, the official Deno (JavaScript), C++, Java, Python, and Swift servers.

Socket.IO primarily uses the WebSocket protocol with polling as a fallback option, while providing the same interface. Although it can be used simply as a wrapper for WebSockets, it provides many additional features such as heartbeats and timeouts.

It can be installed with the npm (Node Package Manager).

== See also ==
- JavaScript framework
- JavaScript library
- SignalR
