= Comparison of web template engines =

The following table lists the various web template engines used in Web template systems and a brief rundown of their features.

Engine (implementation) (Note: Engine (implementation) : engine name)	Languages (Note: Languages : implementation language of the engine (not the template script language))	License (Note: License : Software license agreement)	Variables (Note: Variables : script language power to use variables)	Functions (Note: Functions : script language power to use functions)	Includes (Note: Includes : script language power include external files)	Conditional inclusion (Note: Conditional inclusion : script language power to conditional includes)	Looping (Note: Looping : script language power to do loops (for, while) or recursion)	Evaluation (language) (Note: Evaluation (language) : script language power to do "eval command" (to the implementation language))	Assignment (Note: Assignment : set names and references to sub-templates (?))	Errors and exceptions (Note: Errors and exceptions : engine output script errors.)	i18n (Note: i18n : Internationalization and localization feature)	Natural templates (Note: Natural templates : the template can be a document as valid as the final result, the engine syntax doesn't break the document's structure)	Inheritance (Note: Inheritance : Supports the ability to inherit a layout from a parent template, separately overriding arbitrary sections of the parent template's content.)
Apache Velocity	Java, C#	Apache	Yes	Yes	Yes	Yes	Yes	Yes	Yes	Yes	No	No	No
ASP.NET (Microsoft)	C#, VB.NET	Proprietary	Yes	Yes	Yes	Yes	Yes	Yes	Yes	Yes	?	?	?
ASP.NET (Mono)	C#	LGPL	Yes	Yes	Yes	Yes	Yes	Yes	Yes	Yes	?	?	?
Laravel Blade	PHP	MIT	Yes	Yes	Yes	Yes	Yes	Yes	Yes	Yes	Yes	No	Yes
CheetahTemplate	Python	MIT	Yes	Yes	Yes	Yes	Yes	Yes	Yes	Yes	No	No	Yes
CodeCharge Studio	Classic ASP, C#, VB.NET, PHP, Perl, Java/JSP, ColdFusion	Proprietary	Yes	Yes	Yes	Yes	Yes	Yes	Yes	No	Yes	Yes	?
ColdFusion	CFML, CFScript	Proprietary	Yes	Yes	Yes	Yes	Yes	Yes	Yes	Yes	Yes	Yes	Yes
CTPP	C, C++, Perl, PHP, Python	BSD-like	Yes	Yes	Yes	Yes	Yes	No	No	Yes	No	Yes	No
Django	Python	BSD-like	Yes	Yes	Yes	Yes	Yes	Yes	Yes	Yes	Yes	No	Yes
Epsilon Generation Language	Java	Eclipse Public License	Yes	Yes	Yes	Yes	Yes	Yes	Yes	Yes	No	Yes	No
EJS	JavaScript	Various	Yes	Yes	Yes	Yes	Yes	Yes	Yes	Yes	Yes	Yes	Yes
eRuby	Ruby	GNU GPL / Ruby License	Yes	Yes	Yes	Yes	Yes	Yes	Yes	Yes	Yes	Yes	No
FreeMarker	Java	Apache	Yes	Yes	Yes	Yes	Yes	Yes	Yes	Yes	Yes	No	No
Genshi	Python	BSD-like	Yes	Yes	Yes	Yes	Yes	Yes (Python)	Yes	Yes	Yes	Yes	No
Go templates	Go	BSD	Yes	Yes	Yes	Yes	Yes	Yes	Yes	Yes	Yes	Yes	No
Haml	Ruby, PHP (WIP)	MIT	Yes	Yes	Yes	Yes	Yes	Yes (Ruby)	Yes	Yes	Yes	No	No
Hamlets	Java	BSD	Yes	Yes	Yes	Yes	Yes	No	Yes	Yes	?	?	?
JavaServer Pages	Java	CDDL + GNU GPL	Yes	Yes	Yes	Yes	Yes	Yes	Yes	Yes	?	Yes	?
Jinja	Python	BSD	Yes	Yes	Yes	Yes	Yes	Yes (Python)	Yes	No	Yes	No	Yes
Jinja2	Python	BSD	Yes	Yes	Yes	Yes	Yes	Yes (Python)	Yes	Yes	Yes	No	Yes
Tera	Rust	MIT	Yes	Yes	Yes	Yes	Yes	No	Yes	Yes	No	No	No
Kid	Python	MIT	Yes	Yes	Yes	Yes	Yes	Yes (Python)	Yes	Yes	No	Yes	No
Lucee	CFML	LGPL	Yes	Yes	Yes	Yes	Yes	Yes (CFML)	Yes	Yes	Yes	Yes	Yes
Mako	Python	MIT	Yes	Yes	Yes	Yes	Yes	Yes (Python)	Yes	Yes	Yes	No	Yes
Mustache	30+ languages	MIT	Yes	Yes	Yes	Yes	Yes (foreach)	No	No	Yes	Yes	Yes	Yes
Open Power Template	PHP 5	BSD-like	Yes	Yes	Yes	Yes	Yes	Yes (PHP)	Yes	Yes	No	Yes	Yes
Pebble	Java	BSD	Yes	Yes	Yes	Yes	Yes	No	Yes	Yes	Yes	No	Yes
PHP	PHP	PHP License	Yes	Yes	Yes	Yes	Yes	Yes	Yes	Yes	Yes	Yes	No
Pug	JavaScript	MIT	Yes	Yes	Yes	Yes	Yes	Yes (JavaScript)	Yes	Yes	No	No	Yes
Razor	C#, F#, VB.NET	Apache	Yes	Yes	Yes	Yes	Yes	Yes	Yes	Yes	Yes	Yes	Yes
Smarty	PHP	LGPL	Yes	Yes	Yes	Yes	Yes	Yes (PHP)	Yes	Yes?	Yes	No	Yes
Slim	Ruby	MIT	Yes	Yes	Yes	Yes	Yes	Yes	Yes	Yes	No	No	Yes
Template Attribute Language	Various	open source	Yes	Yes	Yes	Yes	Yes	Yes	Yes	Yes	No	Yes	?
Template Toolkit	Perl, Python	Perl	Yes	Yes	Yes	Yes	Yes	Yes (Perl)	Yes	Yes	No	No	Yes
Thymeleaf	Java	Apache	Yes	Yes	Yes	Yes	Yes	Yes	Yes	Yes	Yes	Yes	No
Twig	PHP	BSD	Yes	Yes	Yes	Yes	Yes	No	Yes	Yes	Yes	No	Yes
web2py	Python	LGPL3	Yes	Yes	Yes	Yes	Yes	Yes	Yes	Yes	Yes	Yes	Yes
WebMacro	Java	Apache, GNU GPL	Yes	Yes	Yes	Yes	Yes	Yes	Yes	Yes	?	?	?
Engine (implementation)	Languages	License	Variables	Functions	Includes	Conditional inclusion	Looping	Evaluation (language)	Assignment	Errors and exceptions	i18n	Natural templates	Inheritance

== See also ==
- Template processor
- Web template system
- JavaScript templating
- Category:Template engines
- Java template engine performance report in spring boot
