= Comparison of object database management systems =

This is a comparison of notable object database management systems, showing what fundamental object database features are implemented natively.

| Name | Current Stable Version | Language(s) | SQL support | Datatypes | License | Description |
|---|---|---|---|---|---|---|
| Caché | 2017.2.1 | Caché ObjectScript (dynamic language), Basic. Java/.NET object mapping supported. | SQL subset. Object notation allowed. Supports embedded SQL, dynamic SQL and xDBC access. | | Proprietary | MUMPS ancestry. Includes built-in support for XML, Web/AJAX and an EMB system called Ensemble. Supports embedded, client/server and distributed implementations. |
| ConceptBase | 8.1.13 (2019-12-09) | Telos | CBQL (based on Datalog) | no types but classes | open source, FreeBSD-style license | historical db, active rules, meta-modeling, deductive rules |
| Db4o | 8.0 (2011-03-09) | C#, Java | db4o-sql | .NET and Java data types | GPL, custom, proprietary | Native Queries, LINQ support, automatic schema evolution, Transparent Activation/Persistence, replication to RDBMS, Object Manager plugin for Visual Studio and Eclipse |
| GemStone/S | 3.7.4.3 (2025-07-22) | Smalltalk | None | Objects and code | Proprietary, free version available | Persistent, transactional, multi-user Smalltalk developed by GemTalk Systems. |
| ObjectDatabase++ | 4.4 (2015-07-03) | C++, TScript | | | Proprietary | Embedded |
| ObjectDB | 2.4.6 | Java | None, uses JPA or JDO | | Proprietary | |
| Objectivity/DB | 10.2.1 | C++, C#, Java, Python, Smalltalk and XML | SQL superset | | Proprietary | Distributed, Parallel Query Engine |
| ObjectStore | 7.2 (July 2011) | C++, Java, interoperable with .NET | SQL subset (also has own object query language) | | Proprietary | Embedded database supporting efficient, distributed management of C++ and Java objects. Avoids the complexities and limitations of ORM products such as Hibernate by storing objects directly with their relationships intact. Uses a page-based mapping system for fast locking and efficient, distributed, client-side caching. |
| ODABA | 12.3.0 (August 2013) | C++, .NET | SQL subset, DQL | Basic Types, Classes, Multiple inheritance, Weak Typed | GPL | Terminology-oriented database |
| OpenAccess | 2.2 | C++ | no | | Proprietary | EDA database |
| OpenLink Virtuoso (Virtuoso Universal Server) | 7.2.7 (May 2022) | C++, Java/JSP, ASP, ASPX, Mono, RDF, SPARQL, SPARUL, SQL, Perl, Python, PHP, Ruby, XML, ODBC, JDBC, ADO.NET, more | SQL 9x/200x | | GPL or proprietary | |
| Perst | Java: 4.38 (2015-03-18) C#: 4.46 (2014-08-23) | Java (including Java SE, Java ME & Android), C# (including .NET, .NET Compact Framework, Mono & Silverlight) | JSQL – object-oriented subset of SQL | Java and .NET data types | GPL, Proprietary | Small footprint embedded database. Diverse indexes and specialized collection classes; LINQ; replication; ACID transactions; native full text search; includes Silverlight, Android and Java ME demo apps. |
| Picolisp | 3.1.1 | Picolisp | | | MIT License | DB built into the language |
| Versant Object Database / VOD / FastObjects | 10 (2021) / 9 (2015) / 14 (2020) | C++ / Java / C# | OQL (ODMG 3.0) | | Proprietary | |
| Zope Object Database | | Python, C | No support. Object indexing and searching is done through ZCatalog facility. | | Zope Public License | |

== See also ==
- Comparison of object–relational database management systems
- Comparison of relational database management systems
- Object–relational database
