= Comparison of object–relational database management systems =

This is a comparison of object–relational database management systems (ORDBMSs). Each system has at least some features of an object–relational database; they vary widely in their completeness and the approaches taken.

The following tables compare general and technical information; please see the individual products' articles for further information. Unless otherwise specified in footnotes, comparisons are based on the stable versions without any add-ons, extensions or external programs.

== Basic data ==
Name	Vendor	License	OS	Notes
Adaptive Server Enterprise	SAP	Proprietary	Cross-platform	
Caché	InterSystems	Proprietary	Cross-platform	
CUBRID	NHN Corporation	GPL/BSD	Linux, Windows	
IBM Db2	IBM	Proprietary	Cross-platform	
GigaSpaces	GigaSpaces	Apache-2.0 or Proprietary	Cross-platform	
Greenplum Database	Greenplum division of EMC Corporation	Proprietary	?	Uses PostgreSQL codebase
Informix	IBM	Proprietary	Cross-platform	
Microsoft SQL Server	Microsoft Corporation	Proprietary	Windows, Linux	Supports data objects in .NET languages
OpenEdge Advanced Business Language (formerly Progress 4GL)	Progress Software Corporation	Proprietary	Cross-platform	
Oracle Database	Oracle Corporation	Proprietary	Linux, Windows, Unix	
PostgreSQL	PostgreSQL Global Development Group	PostgreSQL License	Cross-platform	
Virtuoso Universal Server	OpenLink Software	GPLv2 or proprietary	Cross-platform	
VMDS (Version Managed Data Store)	GE Energy, a division of General Electric	Proprietary	?	GIS for public utilities; can be stored inside Oracle Database
WakandaDB	4th Dimension	AGPLv3 or proprietary	Windows, Linux, macOS	Based on REST and server-side JavaScript
XDB Enterprise Server	Micro Focus	Proprietary	DOS, Windows NT, OS/2	
YugabyteDB	Yugabyte	Apache 2.0	Linux	
Zope Object Database	Zope Corporation	Zope Public License	Cross-platform	For Python, also included in Zope web application server

== Object features ==
Information about what fundamental ORDBMSes features are implemented natively.

	Type	Method	Type inheritance	Table inheritance
CUBRID	Yes	Yes	Yes	Yes
Oracle	Yes	Yes (Note: No private methods, no way to call super method from a child.)	Yes	Yes
OpenLink Virtuoso	Yes	Yes	Yes	Yes
PostgreSQL	Yes	Yes	Yes	Yes
Informix	Yes	Yes	Yes	Yes
WakandaDB	Yes	Yes	Yes	Yes

== Data types ==
Information about what data types are implemented natively.

	Array	List	Set	Multiset	Object reference
CUBRID	Yes	Yes	Yes	Yes	Yes
Oracle	Yes	Yes	Yes	Yes	Yes
OpenLink Virtuoso	Yes	Yes	Yes	Yes	Yes
PostgreSQL	Yes	Yes	Yes	Yes	Yes
Informix	No	Yes	Yes	Yes	Yes

== See also ==
- Comparison of database administration tools
- Comparison of object database management systems
- Comparison of relational database management systems
- DB-Engine Ranking list
- List of relational database management systems
