= Kupu (disambiguation) =

Kupu is a former text editor for web browsers.

Kupu may also refer to:

- KUPU (TV), a television station in Honolulu, Hawaii
- Kupu, Estonia, a village
