= Template system =

Template system may refer to:

- Template processor, software designed to combine templates with a data model to produce result documents
  - Web template system, a system that allows web designers and developers work with web templates to automatically generate custom web pages
