= Openlink =

OpenLink may refer to:

- Norfolk Open Link, a wifi connectivity programme in Norwich, UK
- OpenLink Software, developer of Virtuoso Universal Server
