= Jinja =

Jinja may refer to:

- Jinja, Uganda, a city in eastern Uganda close to the source of the Nile River
  - Jinja District, Uganda, named after the above city
- Shinto shrine, also called a "jinja", a structure that houses one or more Shinto kami (spirits or phenomena)
- Jinja (template engine), for the Python programming language
