= JavaScript templating =

Client side data binding method implemented with JavaScript

JavaScript templating refers to the client side data binding method implemented with the JavaScript language. This approach became popular thanks to JavaScript's increased use, its increase in client processing capabilities, and the trend to outsource computations to the client's web browser. Popular JavaScript templating libraries are AngularJS, Backbone.js, Ember.js, Handlebars.js, JSX (used by React), Vue.js and Mustache.js. A frequent practice is to use double curly brackets (i.e. {{key}}) to call values of the given key from data files, often JSON objects.

== Examples ==
All examples use an external file presidents.json with following contents

{
  "presidents" : [
      { "name": "Washington", "firstname": "George", "born": "1732", "death": "1799" },
      { "name": "Lincoln", "firstname": "Abraham", "born": "1809", "death": "1865" }
  ]
}

All examples will produce the following HTML list:

- Washington (1732–1799)
- Lincoln (1809–1865)

Library
HTML Code
Explanation

DNA Template

<link rel="stylesheet" type="text/css" href=".../template.css"/>
<script src=".../jquery.min.js"></script>
<script src=".../jquery.template.min.js"></script> ➊

Our favorite presidents are:
<ul id="target">
    <li template="[presidents]" z-var="name ., born ., death .">
     ${name} (${born}-${death})
    </li>
</ul> ➋

<script>
    $.getJSON('.../presidents.json', function(data) {
        $('#target').template(data);
    });
</script> ➌

➊ Load the necessary resources, including required jQuery
➋ The HTML code with template attribute marking for-each subtemplate and z-var replacement instructions.
➌ Load JSON data from presidents.json and apply data to the HTML template with id attribute "target".

Mustache.js

<script src=".../jquery.min.js"></script>
<script src=".../mustache.min.js"></script> ➊

Our favorite presidents are:
<ul id="target"></ul> ➋

<script id="president-template" type="text/template">
    {{#presidents}}
        <li>{{name}} ({{born}}-{{death}})</li>
    {{/presidents}}
</script> ➌

<script>
    $.getJSON('.../presidents.json', function(data) {
        var template = $('#president-template').html();
        var info = Mustache.to_html(template, data);
        $('#target').html(info);
    });
</script> ➍

➊ Load the necessary libraries, here mustache.js and jQuery
➋ The HTML code provides a "target" to insert generated contents into.
➌ Provide a template named "president-template".
➍ Last is a function grasping the JSON data, and for each president's subitem, grasping one template and filling it to finally select the HTML page's target appending the whole to it.

Templating becomes useful when the information distributed may change, is too large to be maintained in various HTML pages by available human resources and not large enough to require heavier server-side templating.

== See also ==
- Comparison of web template engines
