= Huuto.net =

Finnish online auctioning website

- Website type: Online auction
- Available in: Finnish
- Owner: ePrice Oy
- Creator: Lari Lohikoski
- Website: huuto.net
- Commercial: Yes
- Registration: Required for bidding and selling
- Launched: January 1999

Huuto.net is a Finnish online auctioning website. It was established in 1999 and has been owned by ePrice Oy since 2019.

The main differences between Huuto.net and eBay are:

- Listing items on Huuto.net is free of charge. Users who have sold over 50 items in the last 12 months are charged a fee should an item sell, the same as eBay.
- Sellers can store "templates" of up to five items within their accounts for future editing and listing. eBay users need an app like TurboLister to do this, although TurboLister is not limited to five items.
- Huuto.net uses conventional bidding and proxy bidding. The first bid however is raised from the seller's start bid, and does not begin at that price.
- Huuto.net does not (as of May 2014) offer PayPal as a payment method.
- "Standard" users cannot message other users. Users are required to upgrade (for a fee) to get this facility.
- Positive, neutral or negative (e.g.: those who fail to pay, etc.) feedback can be left for buyers. This was removed from eBay some time ago.

The name of the website is derived from huutokauppa (Finnish for "auction").

On August 18, 2007, Huuto.net had more than 500,000 items on sale. By March 26, 2014, this had risen to over 1.8 million items.

== History ==
Huuto.net was created in January 1999 by Lari Lohikoski in Helsinki. It was a private service until the art auction Bukowskis bought it from Lohikoski in September 1999. Bukowski announced they would develop Huuto.net into an international auction of collectibles, but it was never done. Instead, they sold the website to Sonera Plaza Oyj in May 2001. After the fusion of Sonera Plaza with Sonera, which later combined with Telia to form TeliaSonera, Huuto.net followed along.

TeliaSonera concentrated heavily on its telephone operator business and neglected many unrelated branches, Huuto.net being one of them. Thus, the website did not develop much in the ownership of TeliaSonera and its functionality suffered. In June 2005 TeliaSonera sold Huuto.net to Ilta-Sanomat Oy and the website became the most popular Finnish classified advertising service. In 2019 Huuto.net was sold to ePrice Oy.

== See also ==
- Keltainen Pörssi
- online auction business model
- eBay
- Tradera
