= Armin Ronacher =

Austrian open source software programmer (born 1989)

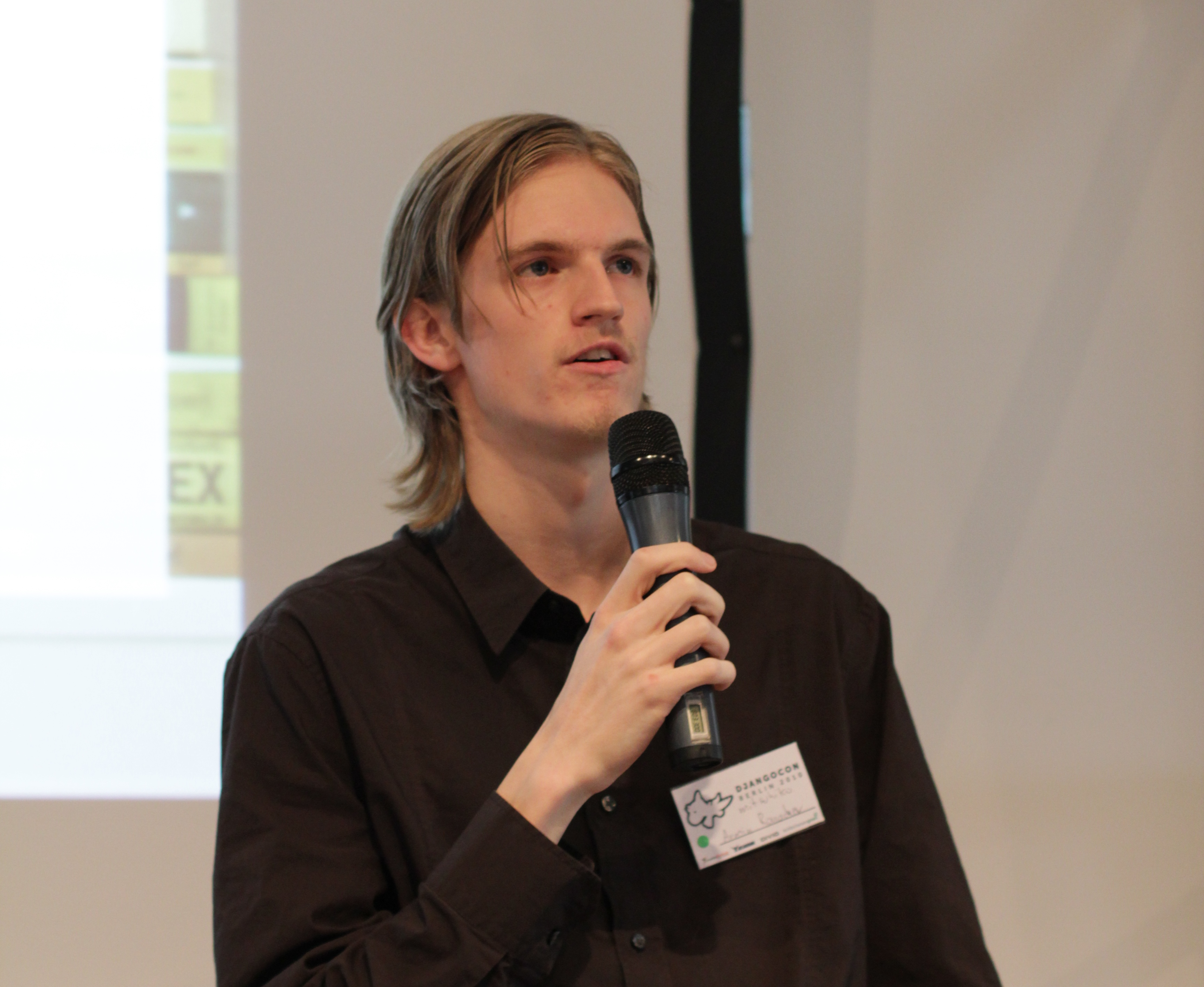
- Ronacher in 2010
- Born: 10 May 1989 (age 37)
- Other name: mitsuhiko
- Occupation: Programmer
- Known for: Flask web framework
- Website: lucumr.pocoo.org

Armin Ronacher (born 10 May 1989) is an Austrian open source software programmer and the creator of the Flask web framework for Python.

He is a frequent speaker at developer conferences and has a popular blog about software development and open source.

== Education ==
Ronacher has a Bachelor's in Business Administration and Software Engineering from Graz University of Technology, Austria.

== Programming ==
Ronacher started his work in open source as a freelance developer for the German Ubuntu Community portal "ubuntuusers" through which he later became a founding member of the German Ubuntu Association in 2005.

While working on ubuntuusers, Ronacher re-discovered the Python programming language and wrote some of the earliest implementations for WSGI with the goal to write a bulletin board in Python together with Georg Brandl. This board was to be called "Pocoo" and to be a replacement for phpBB in Python. While the bulletin board never managed a stable release, many other projects appeared out of the Pocoo umbrella project: the Pygments syntax highlighter, the Sphinx documentation generator, the Jinja template engine and many other libraries for Python. He also contributed functionality for the Python AST module and the Ordered Dict for Python. After an elaborate April fool's joke where he bundled his libraries in a one-file microframework he decided to create the Flask web framework. It went on to become one of the two most popular web development frameworks (next to Django) for Python and the associated libraries found a new home under the "Pallets" community.

He also created the Lektor CMS and contributed to a large list of Open Source applications and libraries.

He worked for Plurk, for Fireteam (a game network infrastructure company owned by Splash Damage), and for the Sentry crash reporting tool.

He has contributed to the Pi AI coding agent harness. In June 2026, The Wall Street Journal reported on his criticism of overuse of vibe coding in the software development industry.

Armin Ronacher is a frequent speaker at open source conferences around the world.

== Recognition ==
- 2003: 2nd place at the 2003 Prix Ars Electronica in the u19 freestyle computing for "Be a Bee"
- 2012: Fellow of the Python Software Foundation
- 2014: Python Software Foundation Community Service Award for his work in the Python Open Source community
- 2014: Shuttleworth Foundation flash grant
