= SPARUL =

SPARUL, or SPARQL/Update, was a declarative data manipulation language that extended the SPARQL 1.0 query language standard. SPARUL provided the ability to insert, delete and update RDF data held within a triple store or quad store. SPARUL was originally written by Hewlett-Packard and has been used as the foundation for the current W3C recommendation entitled SPARQL 1.1 Update. With the publication of SPARQL 1.1, SPARUL is superseded and should only be consulted as a source of inspiration for possible future refinements of SPARQL, but not for real-world applications.

== Examples ==
Adding some triples to a graph. The snippet describes two RDF triples to be inserted into the default graph of the RDF store.

PREFIX dc: <http://purl.org/dc/elements/1.1/>
INSERT DATA
{ <http://example/book3> dc:title    "A new book" ;
                         dc:creator  "A.N.Other" .
}

This SPARQL/Update request contains a triple to be deleted and a triple to be added (used here to correct a book title). The requested change happens in the named graph identified by the URI http://example/bookStore.

PREFIX dc: <http://purl.org/dc/elements/1.1/>

DELETE DATA FROM <http://example/bookStore>
{ <http://example/book3>  dc:title  "Fundamentals of Compiler Design" }

INSERT DATA INTO <http://example/bookStore>
{ <http://example/book3>  dc:title  "Fundamentals of Compiler Design" }

The example below has a request to delete all records of old books (with date before year 2000)

PREFIX dc:  <http://purl.org/dc/elements/1.1/>
PREFIX xsd: <http://www.w3.org/2001/XMLSchema#>

DELETE
 { ?book ?p ?v }
WHERE
  { ?book dc:date ?date .
    FILTER ( ?date < "2000-01-01T00:00:00"^^xsd:dateTime )
    ?book ?p ?v
  }

This snippet copies records from one named graph to another named graph based on a pattern.

PREFIX dc:  <http://purl.org/dc/elements/1.1/>
PREFIX xsd: <http://www.w3.org/2001/XMLSchema#>

INSERT INTO <http://example/bookStore2>
 { ?book ?p ?v }
WHERE
  { GRAPH  <http://example/bookStore>
       { ?book dc:date ?date .
         FILTER ( ?date < "2000-01-01T00:00:00"^^xsd:dateTime )
         ?book ?p ?v
  } }

An example to move records from one named graph to another named graph based on a pattern.

PREFIX dc:  <http://purl.org/dc/elements/1.1/>
PREFIX xsd: <http://www.w3.org/2001/XMLSchema#>

INSERT INTO <http://example/bookStore2>
 { ?book ?p ?v }
WHERE
  { GRAPH  <http://example/bookStore>
     { ?book dc:date ?date .
       FILTER ( ?date < "2000-01-01T00:00:00"^^xsd:dateTime )
       ?book ?p ?v
     }
  }

DELETE FROM <http://example/bookStore>
 { ?book ?p ?v }
WHERE
  { GRAPH  <http://example/bookStore>
      { ?book dc:date ?date .
        FILTER ( ?date < "2000-01-01T00:00:00"^^xsd:dateTime )
        ?book ?p ?v
      }
  }

== SPARQL/Update implementations ==
- AllegroGraph
- ARQ
- D2R Server
- Jena
- OntoBroker
- Ontotext OWLIM
- Oracle DB Enterprise Ed.
- Parliament
- Redland / Redstore
- StrixDB supports SPARQL/Update 1.0.
- OpenLink Virtuoso Universal Server

== Clients supporting SPARUL ==
- tabulator
