= Virtuoso Universal Server =

Computer software

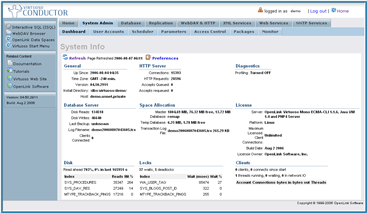
- Virtuoso Conductor (Database Administration User Interface)
- Developer: OpenLink Software
- Stable release: 7.2.17 / 7 May 2026; 43 days ago
- Written in: C
- Operating system: Cross-platform
- Type: Triplestore, RDBMS, Application server, Web server
- License: GPLv2 and proprietary
- Website: virtuoso.openlinksw.com
- Repository: github.com/openlink/virtuoso-opensource

Virtuoso Universal Server is a middleware and database engine hybrid that combines the functionality of a traditional relational database management system (RDBMS), object–relational database (ORDBMS), virtual database, RDF, XML, free-text, web application server and file server functionality in a single system. Rather than have dedicated servers for each of the aforementioned functionality realms, Virtuoso is a "universal server"; it enables a single multithreaded server process that implements multiple protocols. The free and open source edition of Virtuoso Universal Server is also known as OpenLink Virtuoso. The software has been developed by OpenLink Software with Kingsley Uyi Idehen and Orri Erling as the chief software architects.

== Database structure ==
=== Core database engine ===
Virtuoso provides an extended object–relational model, which combines the flexibility of relational access with inheritance, run time data typing, late binding, and identity-based access. Virtuoso Universal Server database includes physical file and in memory storage and operating system processes that interact with the storage. There is one main process, which has listeners on a specified port for HTTP, SOAP, and other protocols.

==== Architecture ====
Virtuoso is designed to take advantage of operating system threading support and multiple CPUs. It consists of a single process with an adjustable pool of threads shared between clients. Multiple threads may work on a single index tree with minimal interference with each other. One cache of database pages is shared among all threads and old dirty pages are written back to disk as a background process.

The database has at all times a clean checkpoint state and a delta of committed or uncommitted changes to this checkpointed state. This makes it possible to do a clean backup of the checkpoint state while transactions proceed on the commit state.

A transaction log file records all transactions since the last checkpoint. Transaction log files may be preserved and archived for an indefinite time, providing a full, recoverable history of the database.

A single set of files is used for storing all tables. A separate set of files is used for all temporary data. The maximum size of a file set is 32 terabytes, for 4G × 8K pages.

==== Locking ====
Virtuoso provides dynamic locking, starting with row level locks and escalating to page level locks when a cursor holds a large percentage of a page's rows or when it has a history of locking entire pages. Lock escalation only happens when no other transactions hold locks on the same page, hence it never deadlocks. Virtuoso SQL provides means for exclusive read and for setting transaction isolation.

==== Transactions ====
All four levels of isolation are supported: Dirty read, read committed, repeatable read and serializable. The level of isolation may be specified operation by operation within a single transaction. Virtuoso can also act as a resource manager and/or transaction coordinator under Microsoft's Distributed Transaction Coordinator (MS DTC) or the XA standard.

==== Data integrity ====
Virtuoso ORDBMS database supports entity integrity and referential integrity. Virtuoso ensures that relationships between records in related tables are valid by enforcing referential integrity. Integrity constraints include:

- NOT NULL – Within the definition of a table, Virtuoso allows data to contain a NULL value. This NULL value is not really a value at all and is considered an absence of value. The constraint of NOT NULL forces a value to be given to a column.
- Unique key – Uniqueness for a column or set of columns means that the values in that column or set of columns must be different from all other columns or set of columns in that table. A unique key may contain NULL values since they are by definition a unique non-valued value.
- Primary key – Primary key are much like unique keys except that they are designed to uniquely identify a row in a table. They can consist of a single column or multiple columns. The primary key cannot contain a NULL value.
- CHECK Constraint – Virtuoso provides on a column an integrity constraint that requires certain conditions to be met before the data is inserted or modified. If the checks are not satisfied then the transaction cannot be completed.

==== Data dictionary ====
Virtuoso stores all its information about all user objects in the database in the system catalog tables designated by db.dba*.

=== Components and files ===
==== Components ====
Virtuoso is made up of client and server components. These components typically communicate with a local or remote Virtuoso server, which include:

- Virtuoso Drivers for ODBC, JDBC, ADO.NET and OLE DB
- Conductor, a web-based database administration user interface
- ISQL (Interactive SQL) and ISQO Utilities
- Documentation and Tutorials
- Samples

Installations come with two databases: a default and a demo database.

== History ==
The Virtuoso project was born in 1998 from a merger of the OpenLink data access middleware and Kubl RDBMS.

=== Kubl RDBMS ===
The Kubl ORDBMS was one of a list of relational database systems with roots in Finland. This list also includes MySQL, InnoDB, and Solid RDBMS/Solid Technologies.

As is the case with most technology products, key personnel behind OpenLink Virtuoso, InnoDB, and Solid share periods of professional overlap that provide noteworthy insight into the history of database technology development in Finland. Heikki Tuuri (creator of InnoDB), Ora Lassila (W3C and Nokia Research, a technology lead and visionary in the areas RDF and Semantic Web in general alongside Tim Berners-Lee), and Orri Erling (Virtuoso Program Manager at OpenLink Software) all worked together in a startup company called Entity Systems in Finland – where they were developing Common Lisp and Prolog development environments for the early generation of PC's circa. 1986–88.

Later, Orri Erling worked with VIA International, the developer of VIA/DRE in designing a LISP-based object-oriented data access layer atop the company's DBMS product. The core development team of VIA, following the company's demise in 1992, went on to found Solid Technologies under the direction of Artturi Tarjanne.

Heikki Tuuri worked at Solid for a while before starting his own database development project which became InnoDB (acquired by Oracle in 2005).

Orri Erling started his own DBMS development work in 1994, which was to become Kubl. Development of Kubl was initially financed by Infosto Group, publisher of Finland's largest free ads paper, as part of their in-house software development project for their on-line services. The on-line version of Keltainen Pörssi was at one time said to be Finland's most popular web site with 500,000 registered users. The Kubl database was prominently displayed in a "Powered by Kubl" logo on the search results.

A free trial version of Kubl was made available for download on November 7, 1996.

Kubl was marketed as a high performance lightweight database for embedded use; the development aim was to achieve top scores in Transactions Per Second tests. Pricing of the product was especially favorable to Linux users with a Linux license priced at $199.

Kubl became the cornerstone of OpenLink Virtuoso, after the technology paths of Kingsley Uyi Idehen and Orri Erling crossed in 1998, leading to the acquisition of Kubl by OpenLink Software.

== Functionality realms ==
Virtuoso's functionality covers a broad range of traditionally distinct realms in a single product offering. These functional realms include:

- Object–relational database engine for (SQL, XML, RDF and plain text)
- Web services computing platform
- Web application server
- Web content management system (WCMS)
- NNTP-based discussion management
- Replication of homogeneous and heterogeneous data
- Mail Storage Sink and (POP3) service proxy
- DataPortability

=== Protocols implemented ===
Virtuoso supports a broad range of industry standard Web & Internet protocols that includes: HTTP, WebDAV, CalDAV, CardDAV, SOAP, UDDI, WSDL, WS-Policy, WS-Security, WS-ReliableMessaging, WS-Routing, WS-Referral, WS-Attachment, WS-BPEL, SyncML, GData, SPARQL, SPARUL, NNTP

=== API support ===
For the database application developer and systems integrator, Virtuoso implements a variety of industry standard data access APIs (client and server) that includes: ODBC, JDBC, OLE DB, ADO.NET, ADO.NET Entity Framework, XMLA.

=== Content syndication and interchange format support ===
For the Web application developer and content syndicate(s) publishers, and consumers, Virtuoso supports standards such as: Atom, RSS 2.0, RSS 1.0, OPML, XBEL, FOAF, SIOC.

== Query language support ==
SQL, SPARQL (with numerous extensions), XQuery (implementation of Core functions library is seriously incomplete), XPath (1.0 only), XSLT (1.0 only)

=== Schema definition language support ===
SQL's Data Definition Language, XML Schema

== Usage scenarios ==
Virtuoso is a solution for the following system integration challenges:

- Enterprise Information Integration (EII)
- Programming Language Independent Web application deployment
- Monolithic application decomposition that leverages the principles of service-oriented architecture
- Web service based enterprise application integration via a significant amount of WS-* protocols support
- Business process management via BPEL
- Semantic Web Data Spaces Generation
- Deployment platform for injecting RDF-based Linked Data into the Semantic Data Web

== Related technology areas ==
=== Data management ===
- Relational database management system
- List of relational database management systems
- Comparison of object–relational database management systems
- Comparison of relational database management systems

=== Enterprise application, information, and data integration ===
- Web 2.0
- Enterprise service bus
- Service-oriented architecture
- Enterprise application integration
- Data integration
- Open Semantic Framework
- Web service
- Semantic Web
- Business Integration Severs Comparison Matrix

== Related products and tools ==
In addition to Virtuoso, OpenLink Software produces several related tools and applications:

- OpenLink Data Spaces – a Virtuoso-based platform for cost-effective creation and management of Semantic Web / Linked Data Web presence. It provides a data junction box for integrating data across third party Social network service, Blog, File sharing, Shared & Social bookmarking, Wiki, E-mail, Photo Sharing, RSS 2.0, Atom, and RSS 1.1 Content Aggregation services. In addition, to its third party integration functionality, it also includes its own rich collection of Linked Data compliant distributed collaborative applications, across each of the aforementioned Web application realms.
- Universal Data Access Drivers – High-performance data access drivers for ODBC, JDBC, ADO.NET, and OLE DB that provide transparent access to enterprise databases across multiple platforms and databases.

== Platforms ==
Virtuoso is supported on a number of 32- and 64-bit platforms including cross-platform Windows, UNIX (HP, AIX, Sun, DEC, BSD, SCO), Linux (Red Hat, SUSE) and macOS.

== Licensing ==
In April 2006, a free software version of Virtuoso was made available under the GNU General Public License version 2. The software is now available in Commercial and Open Source license variants.
