= Keltainen Pörssi =

Finnish small ads magazine

Keltainen Pörssi (Finnish for "the yellow stock market") was Finland's most popular small ads magazine. The magazine was established in 1986 and was part of the Sanoma media group. Ilta-Sanomat Oy was the publisher of the magazine headquartered in Helsinki.

It was available both as a print edition published twice per week and a free online edition, and consisted entirely of small ads by private citizens. These ads were divided into categories for easy browsing. Placing an ad was free of charge, but extra stand-out features and photographs cost money.

Keltainen Pörssi had several supplements, including Autot.

In June 2016 the publication was wound down and visits to the web address directed users to the Huuto.net site, this is an online auction and buy it now site similar to eBay that caters to the Finnish market. Keltainen Pörssi was part of the same media group that owned Huuto.net and Ilta-Sanomat.
