= CodeCharge Studio =

- Developer: YesSoftware, Inc.
- Stable release: 5.1.1.18992 / March 18, 2016; 9 years ago
- Operating system: Windows
- Type: Web application framework / Template Engine
- License: Proprietary
- Website: www.codecharge.com

CodeCharge Studio is a rapid application development (RAD) and integrated development environment (IDE) for creating database-driven web applications. It is a code generator and templating engine that separates the presentation layer from the coding layer, with the aim of allowing designers and programmers to work cohesively in a web application (the model-view-controller design pattern).

CodeCharge is the first product released by Yes Software, Inc., after two years of development.

== Software ==
CodeCharge utilizes point-and-click wizards for creating record and search forms, grids, and editable grids without the need for programming. The databases it supports include MySQL, MS SQL Server, MS Access, PostgreSQL, and Oracle, as well as any other database that supports web connectivity. CodeCharge can export code to all major programing languages, such as ASP.NET, ASP, Java, ColdFusion, PHP, and Perl.

CodeCharge employs an interactive user interface (UI) designed for the creation of web applications. When generating code, CodeCharge automatically structures the code, using naming conventions and comments to describe the code's purpose. Moreover, CodeCharge keeps the application separate from the code it generates, so that projects may be converted to any language at any time.

Without additional programming, a CodeCharge-generated project is not a routed web site (where everything is routed through, for example, index.asp); rather, every page is accessible by reference to its own name or URL.

=== Technologies ===
Here are listed technologies which used, when the application is ready and running.

- OOP - The generated application is Object Oriented. Every structural element, like database connection, grid, navigation bar, the visible page itself etc. are all objects.

The application uses the Microsoft .NET 2 Framework and will also install when the .NET 3.5 framework is detected on the host computer.

- Templating - Codecharge uses HTML template pages to generate visible internet sites. Templates of web pages may be previewed before making it "live." There are xxxx.html files, accordingly xxxx.asp (xxxx.php etc.) code files and for server side events a separate xxxx_events.asp (xxxx_events.php etc.) files.
- Customization - CodeCharge provides its users a standard way to set up custom code for handling events not fully addressed by the built-in features.

==== Application generating technologies ====
- PHP
- Perl
- .NET
- Java
- ASP
- Coldfusion
- xml

== Reception ==
In 2003, regarding the original version of CodeCharge Studio, Arbi Arzoumani of PHP Architect wrote:

"For its price tag this code generation application is well worth it. One great application that I can see this being used for is creating prototypes of web applications in very short periods of time. In other words, last minute proposals."

Kevin Yank of SitePoint Tech Times was impressed "by the many ways in which experienced developers could draw added power out of the software, instead of being limited by it, as is the case with most RAD tools for Web development."

In his review of CodeCharge Studio 2.0, Troy Dreier wrote in Intranet Journal, "CodeCharge Studio [allows] Web application developers [to] shave literally months off their development times."

CodeCharge Studio 3.0 received a rating of 3.5 out of 5 from Peter B. MacIntyre of php|architect.

== See also ==
- Comparison of web frameworks
- Web template system
- formats of web applications
