= Norfolk Open Link =

Wireless service in Norwich, England

Norfolk OpenLink logo

Norfolk Open Link was a free wireless service offered by Norfolk County Council in Norwich city centre, and areas of South Norfolk. Norfolk Open Link was the first community wireless network in the UK to provide free internet access for the public sector, the business community and the general public.

The network - that was operational since July 2006 - was part of a pilot scheme that terminated in June 2008. In November 2007, the County Council ran a short survey to assess the impact of the service; after the service ends, a report will be compiled into the impact it has had.

The project was not allowed to compete with commercial WiFi services, so the access speed for businesses and the public has been restricted to 256 kilobits per second, with sessions limited to an hour. A welcome screen displayed to users upon connecting to the network allows public sector staff to log in and access the internet at 1mb per second.
