= Thymeleaf =

Default templating language for Spring Boot

- Developer: Daniel Fernández
- Stable release: 3.1.3 / December 9, 2024; 19 months ago
- Written in: Java
- Operating system: Cross-platform
- Standards: XML, XHTML, HTML5
- Type: Template Engine
- License: Apache License 2.0
- Website: www.thymeleaf.org

Thymeleaf is a Java XML/XHTML/HTML5 template engine that can work both in web (servlet-based) and non-web environments. It is better suited for serving XHTML/HTML5 at the view layer of MVC-based web applications, but it can process any XML file even in offline environments. It provides full Spring Framework integration.

In web applications Thymeleaf aims to be a complete substitute for JavaServer Pages (JSP), and implements the concept of Natural Templates: template files that can be directly opened in browsers and that still display correctly as web pages.

Thymeleaf is open-source software, licensed under the Apache License 2.0.

== Features ==
From the project's website:

- Java template engine for XML, XHTML and HTML5.
- Works both in web and non-web (offline) environments. No hard dependency on the Servlet API.
- Based on modular feature sets called dialects.
  - Dialect features (e.g.: evaluation, iteration, etc.) are applied by linking them to template's tags and/or attributes.
  - Two dialects available out-of-the-box: Standard and SpringStandard (for Spring MVC apps, same syntax as Standard).
  - Developers can extend and create custom dialects.
- Several template modes:
  - XML: validating against a DTD or not.
  - XHTML 1.0 and 1.1: validating against standard DTDs or not.
  - HTML5: both XML-formed code and legacy-based HTML5. Legacy non-XML code will be automatically cleaned and converted to XML form.
- Full (and extensible) internationalization support.
- Configurable, high performance parsed template cache that reduces input/output to the minimum.
- Automatic DOCTYPE translations –from template DTD to result DTD– for (optional) validation of both template and result code.
- Extremely extensible: can be used as a template engine framework if needed.
- Complete documentation including several example applications.

== Thymeleaf example ==
The following example produces an HTML5 table with rows for each item of a List<Product> variable called allProducts.

<table>
  <thead>
    <tr>
      <th th:text="#{msgs.headers.name}">Name</th>
      <th th:text="#{msgs.headers.price}">Price</th>
    </tr>
  </thead>
  <tbody>
    <tr th:each="prod : ${allProducts}">
      <td th:text="${prod.name}">Oranges</td>
      <td th:text="${#numbers.formatDecimal(prod.price,1,2)}">0.99</td>
    </tr>
  </tbody>
</table>

This piece of code includes:

- Internationalization expressions: #{ ... } rh
- Variable/model-attribute evaluation expressions: ${ ... }
- Utility functions: #numbers.formatDecimal( ... )

Also, this fragment of (X)HTML code can be perfectly displayed by a browser as a prototype, without being processed at all: it is a natural template.

== See also ==
- Template engine (web)
- JavaServer Pages
- Spring Framework
- FreeMarker
- Apache Velocity
- Template Attribute Language
