= Kupu, Estonia =

Village in Estonia

Coordinates: 59°27′N 25°29′E

Kupu
- Village
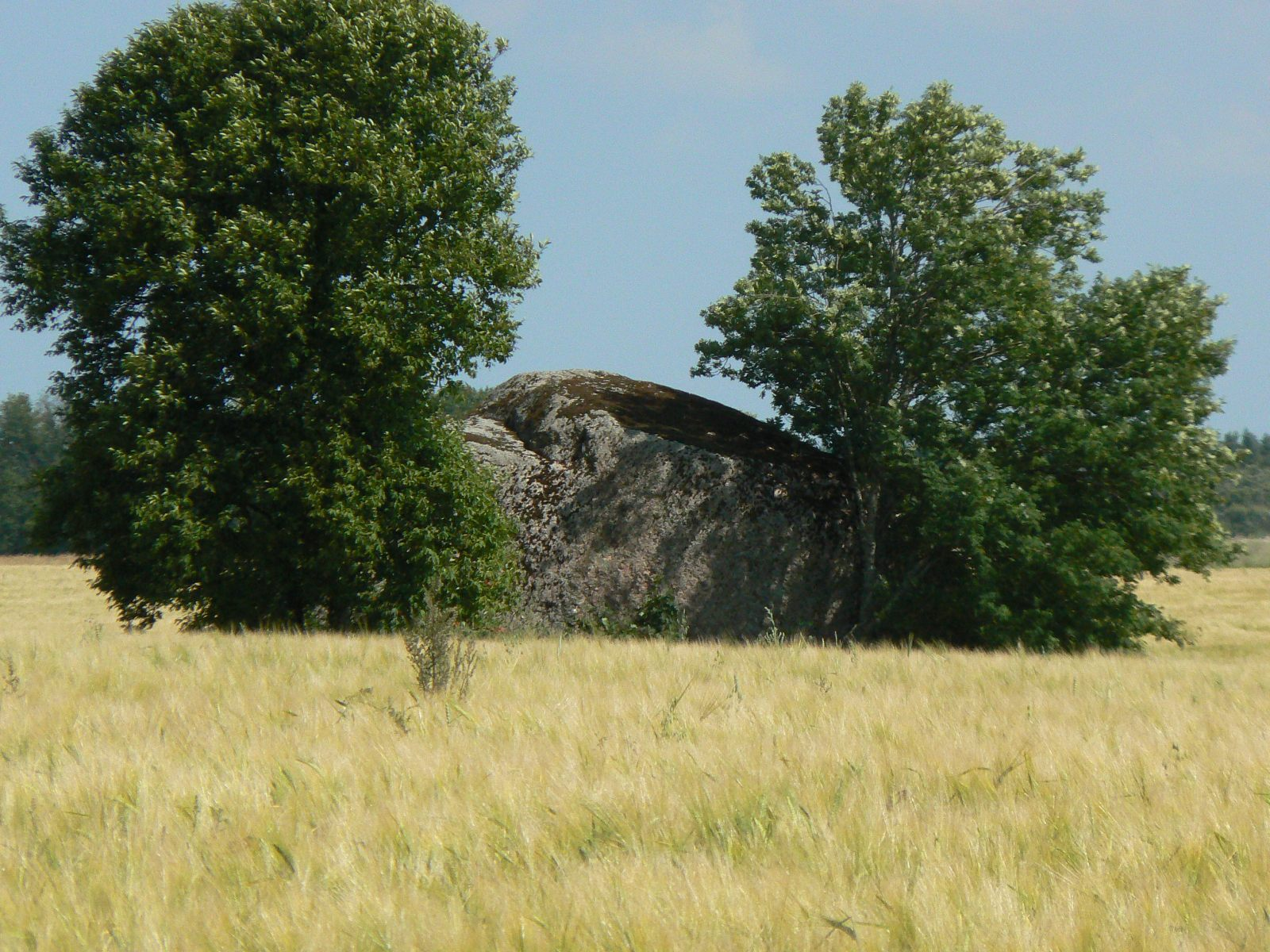
- Interactive map of Kupu
- Country: Estonia
- County: Harju
- Parish: Kuusalu
- Time zone: UTC+2 (EET)
  - Summer (DST): UTC+3 (EEST)

Kupu is a village in Kuusalu Parish, Harju County in northern Estonia.
