= OpenAccess =

OpenAccess is a proprietary API controlled by the OpenAccess Coalition that aims to facilitate Interoperability of electronic design automation software among the members of that coalition.

== OpenAccess Coalition ==
OpenAccess Coalition is a coalition amongst integrated circuit manufacturers to provide a standard for designing integrated circuit chips. The OpenAccess Coalition is an organization of semiconductor industry companies that are leading this effort operating under Silicon Integration Initiative bylaws.

The OpenAccess Coalition consists both of EDA user companies (IC designers and manufacturers) and EDA provider companies, including Advanced Micro Devices, Agile Analog, AnaGlobe Technology, Analog Rails, ANSYS, AWR/National Instruments Corporation, Cadence Design Systems, Chengdu Higon IC Design, CST - Computer Simulation Technology, DXCorr Design, Empyrean Software, Entasys Design, Fractal Technologies, Generation Alpha Transistor, GLOBALFOUNDRIES, Google, Hewlett Packard Enterprise, IBM, Intel, INTENTO DESIGN, Invecas, Jedat, Keysight Technologies, Lattice Semiconductor, Life Technologies, Luceda, MediaTek, Mentor Graphics, Mythic, NVMEngines, PDF Solutions, Pulsic, Qualcomm, Samsung Electronics, Savarti, Silvaco, Synopsys, Taiwan Semiconductor Manufacturing Company Limited, Zuken.

== OpenAccess software ==
OpenAccess consists of a data API of which the source code is available only to coalition members.

The OpenAccess API is a C++ program interface to IC design data stored in an electronic design database, with an architecture designed to ensure easy integration of contributions from various companies which may implement database enhancements or add proprietary extensions. It also includes the reference database supporting that API for IC design in multiple programming languages: C++, C#, Perl, Python, Ruby and Tcl.

In the past, electronic design flows were a combinations of proprietary applications and copyrighted EDA databases, with many different file formats and syntaxes. As a result, significant efforts were required from IC CAD engineers to integrate them for particular projects. The resulting flows were often fragile, inefficient and therefore result in longer design cycles. OpenAccess effort is therefore attempting to create a standardized design flow among its participants.

=== Development history ===
The OpenAccess coalition was formed in Q4 1999. The members issued a request-for-technology for existing technology, looking for a solution that was proven and would be commercially adopted, and that supported a broad set of EDA tools. As a result, the Cadence Genesis database and API was selected and now forms the technology base for OpenAccess.

In 2005 the Cadence Berkeley Labs and the Silicon Integration Initiative launched the OpenAccesGear, a project to develop open source utilities on top of the OpenAccess database. Participants included University of California at Berkeley, UCLA and UCSC. The OAGear project was subsequently suspended. Si2 has offered OAGear as an unsupported project.
