= Template Attribute Language =

Language used for generating HTML or XML

The Template Attribute Language (TAL) is a templating language used to generate dynamic HTML and XML documents. It is designed to facilitate a clear separation between presentation and application logic, thereby supporting collaboration between designers and programmers. This is achieved by expressing template logic through attributes defined in an XML namespace, which are added to otherwise valid HTML or XML elements. By using structured attributes rather than arbitrary embedded code, templates remain well-formed documents that can be viewed and edited with standard XML or HTML authoring systems.

TAL was created for Zope but is used in other Python-based projects as well.

== TASFIA ==
The following attributes are used, normally prefixed by "tal:":

define
creates local variables, valid in the element bearing the attribute (including contained elements)
condition
decides whether or not to render the tag (and all contained text)
repeat
creates a loop variable and repeats the tag iterating a sequence, e.g. for creating a selection list or a table
content
replaces the content of the tag
replace
replaces the tag (and therefore is not usable together with content or attributes)
attributes
replaces the given attributes (e. g. by using tal:attributes="name name; id name" the name and id attributes of an input field could be set to the value of the variable "name")
omit-tag
allows to omit the start and end tag and only render the content if the given expression is true.
on-error
if an error occurs, this attribute works like the content tag.

If a tag has more than one TAL attributes, they are evaluated in the above (fairly logical) order.

In cases when no tag is present which lends itself to take the attributes, special TAL tags can be used, making the "tal:" prefix optional. e.g.:

<tal:if condition="context/itemlist">
...
</tal:if>

would cause the code inside the tal:if tags to be used whenever the context (whatever the application server defines the context to be, e.g. an object) contains variable "itemlist" with a true value, e.g. a list containing at least one element. The identifier following the colon is arbitrary; it simply needs to be there, and to be the same for the opening and closing tag.

== METAL ==
The Macro Expansion Template Attribute Language (METAL) complements TAL, providing macros which allow the reuse of code across template files. Both were created for Zope but are used in other Python projects as well.

METAL complements TAL with the ability to reuse code. It allows the developer to define and use macros, which in turn may have slots; when using a macro, variational content can be specified for a slot.

When generating XML documents, the XML namespace must be specified (xmlns:metal="http://xml.zope.org/namespaces/metal").

=== METAL attributes ===
The following attributes are recognised, normally requiring a „metal:“ prefix:

define-macro
creates a macro
define-slot
creates a slot inside a macro
use-macro
uses a macro (normally given via a TALES path expression)
fill-slot
when using a macro, replaces the default content of the given slot
extend-macro
since Zope v3: extends a macro, comparable to subclassing, by redefining of slots

Normally, just one of those is used at a time.

In cases when no tag is present which lends itself to take the attributes, and in special cases when more than one METAL attribute is needed, special METAL tags can be used, making the „metal:“ prefix optional. E. g. (sketched with Roundup in mind):

 <html metal:define-macro="icing">
 ...
 <metal:myslot define-slot="optional-form">
 ...
 </html>
 
 <html metal:use-macro="templates/page/macros/icing">
 <form metal:fill-slot="optional-form" action="."
         tal:attributes="action context/designator">
 ...
 </form>
 </html>

== Usage ==
TAL/TALES/METAL are used by the following projects:

- Zope (web application server)
- Roundup (issue tracker)

== Other implementations ==
Besides the original Zope implementation, there are (not exhaustive):

=== Python ===
- SimpleTAL
- OpenTAL
- ZPT, a standalone version of Zope Page Templates
- Chameleon, a fast reimplementation of Zope Page Templates

=== C# ===
- SharpTAL

=== Go (Golang) ===
- tal, a native Go implementation of TAL, TALES and METAL

=== JavaScript ===
- template-tal, TAL Implementation for NodeJs
- jstal
- Distal
- DomTal
- ZPT-JS

=== Java ===
- JPT: Java Page Templates
- JavaZPT
- ZPT-Java

=== Perl ===
- PETAL, the Perl Template Attribute Language
- Template-TAL

=== Raku ===
- Flower, a Raku implementation of TAL, with some Petal and PHPTAL extensions.

=== PHP ===
- PHPTAL
- Twital
- Biscuit
- zTAL

=== XSL ===
- XSLTal, transforming TAL via XSLT to XSLT

=== Common Lisp ===
- TALCL: A library that implements the TAL template language for common lisp

=== Similar implementations ===
- ATal – Not really a TAL implementation, but inspired on TAL concepts
- Thymeleaf - Not a TAL implementation, but a similar "natural template" language
