= WebMacro =

WebMacro is a framework for developing Java Servlets. It enforces a Model-View-Controller framework on a project allowing for a clean separation of concerns in the design. In particular, WebMacro keeps program source code absolutely separate from presentation HTML code. WebMacro is open source software.

WebMacro was initially created and designed by Justin Wells at Semiotek Inc. in the mid-2000, when the project was taken over by a team at SourceForge. Extensive discussions of WebMacro on the Java Servlet-Interest mailing list at that time may have been influential in Sun Microsystems decision to move their Java Server Pages product to a Model-View-Controller architecture.

WebMacro can also be used to generate arbitrary text output from templates (one of its uses is automated code generation).

The template language is very similar to the language used in Apache Velocity and there is an automated script to perform the migration.

The Apache Velocity project was started as a clean room re-implementation by Jon Scott Stevens, Geir Magnusson and Jason van Zyl after agreement could not be reached on adoption of the Apache License.

The current version of WebMacro is BSD licensed.
