= Smarty (template engine) =

Web template system

- Developers: Monte Ohrt, Messju Mohr, Uwe Tews
- Release: 2000
- Stable release: 5.8.4 / 29 June 2026; 47 days ago
- Written in: PHP
- Type: Template Engine
- License: LGPL
- Website: www.smarty.net
- Repository: github.com/smarty-php/smarty

Smarty is a web template system written in PHP. Smarty is primarily promoted as a tool for separation of concerns, and is intended to simplify compartmentalization, allowing the front-end of a web page to change separately from its back-end. Ideally, this lowers costs and minimizes the efforts associated with software maintenance.

Smarty generates web content through the placement of special Smarty tags within a document. These tags are processed and substituted with other code. Tags are directives for Smarty that are enclosed by template delimiters. These directives can be variables, denoted by a dollar sign ($), functions, logical or loop statements. Smarty allows PHP programmers to define custom functions that can be accessed using Smarty tags.

== Example ==
In this HTML file, { and } are the delimiters of Smarty tags.

<!DOCTYPE html>
<html lang="en">
<head>
   <meta charset="utf-8">
   <title>{$title_text|escape}</title>
</head>

<body> {* This is a little comment that won't be visible in the HTML source *}
{$body_html}
</body> <!-- this is a little comment that will be seen in the HTML source -->
</html>

The PHP business logic to use the Smarty template above could be:

define('SMARTY_DIR', 'smarty-2.6.22/');
require_once(SMARTY_DIR . 'Smarty.class.php');

$smarty = new Smarty();
$smarty->template_dir = './templates/';
$smarty->compile_dir = './templates/compile/';

$smarty->assign('title_text', 'TITLE: This is the Smarty basic example ...');
$smarty->assign('body_html', '<p>BODY: This is the message set using assign()</p>');

$smarty->display('index.tpl');

== See also ==
- Comparison of web template engines
- Web template system
