= Zope Public License =

Free software license

- Latest version: 2.1
- SPDX identifier: ZPL-1.1, ZPL-2.0, ZPL-2.1
- Debian FSG compatible: Yes
- FSF approved: Yes
- OSI approved: Yes
- GPL compatible: 1.0 No, 2.x Yes
- Copyleft: No

Zope Public License is a free software license, used primarily for the Zope application server software. The license is similar to the well-known BSD license, however the ZPL also adds clauses prohibiting trademark use and requiring documentation of all changes.
