= DSF =

DSF may refer to:

== Business ==
- Dubai Shopping Festival, an annual promotional event
- David Suzuki Foundation, a Canadian environmental charity
- DSF Refractories & Minerals Ltd, a British brick manufacturer
- Deutsches Sportfernsehen, former name of the German TV channel Sport1

== Organizations ==
- Danish Actors' Association, a trade union
- National Union of Students in Denmark
- Deployable Specialized Forces, part of the United States Coast Guard
- Duisenberg School of Finance, in the Netherlands
- Delaware State Fair, in the United States
- Director Special Forces, the commander of the United Kingdom Special Forces
- Society for German–Soviet Friendship (Gesellschaft für Deutsch-Sowjetische Freundschaft), an East German political organization
- Digital solidarity fund, a defunct Swiss NGO
- Democratic Students' Front, an independent political students' organization of Jadavpur University
- Defence Security Force, paramilitary force of Pakistan

== Science and technology ==
- Dispersion-shifted fiber, a type of optical fiber
- DSD Stream File, an audio recording file format
- Django Software Foundation, maintainers of the Django web framework
- Driver: San Francisco, a video game
- Differential scanning fluorimetry, a thermal shift assay technique
- Discrete summation formulas, used in a method of distortion synthesis
- Disjoint-set forest, a disjoint-set data structure
- Dynamic frequency selection, in Wi-Fi networking
- Dynamical structure function, in dynamical system signal structure identification

== Other ==
- Dion Sembie-Ferris (born 1996), English footballer
- Double-skin facade, a building construction technique
- Douglas S. Freeman High School, in Richmond, Virginia
- Director Special Forces, the senior most officer in command of United Kingdom Special Forces
