= Wagtail (disambiguation) =

Wagtails are a group of passerine birds of the genus Motacilla in the family Motacillidae.

Wagtail may also refer to:

- Wagtail (missile), a short range nuclear missile developed for the U.S. Air Force
- Wagtail (software), an open source content management systems
- Westland Wagtail, a prototype British WWI fighter aircraft
- HMS Wagtail, the name of a Royal Navy ship and a shore establishment
- Willie wagtail, a different species of passerine bird found in Australia

== See also ==
- Tail wagging
- The Wagtail's Army, a 1964 Soviet family film
- Wagtail Grove, Queensland, Australia, a locality in the City of Moreton Bay
- Wagtail-tyrant, small birds of the genus Stigmatura in the family Tyrranidae
