= NDSF =

NDSF may mean:

- Nano differential scanning fluorimetry
- National Defense Sealift Fund, a U.S. Navy budget appropriation; see USS Lewis B. Puller (ESB-3) § Construction
- National Development and Social Fund, a citizenship scheme funded largely by Maltese passport fees
- National Diploma of the Society of Floristry
- Notre Dame Shakespeare Festival

== See also ==
- Non-zero dispersion-shifted fiber (NZDSF)
