= Django (web framework) =

Python web framework

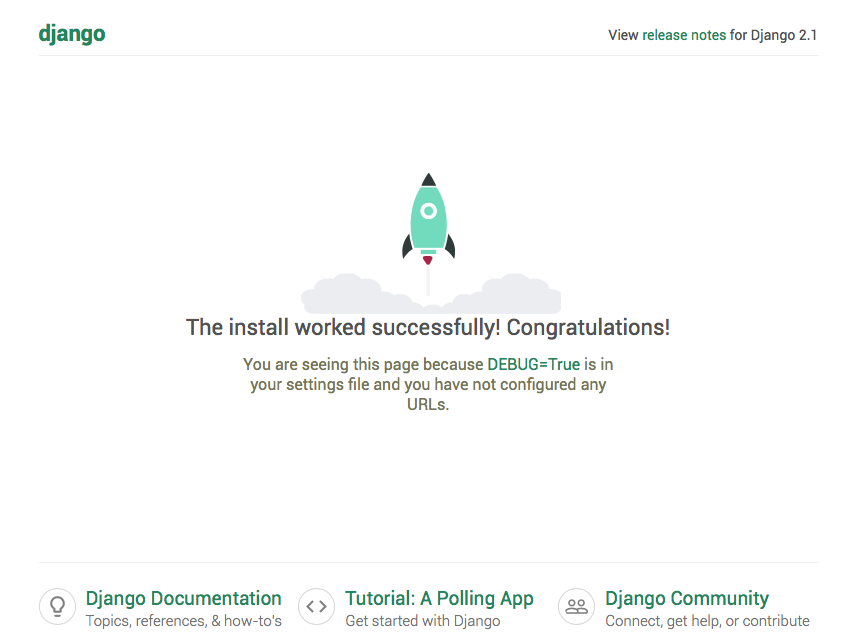
- Original authors: Adrian Holovaty, Simon Willison
- Developer: Django Software Foundation
- Release: 21 July 2005; 21 years ago
- Written in: Python
- Type: Web framework
- License: 3-clause BSD
- Website: www.djangoproject.com
- Repository: github.com/django/django

Django (/ˈdʒæŋɡoʊ/ JANG-goh; sometimes stylized as django) is a free and open-source, Python-based web framework that runs on a web server. It follows the model–template–views (MTV) architectural pattern. It is maintained by the Django Software Foundation (DSF), an independent organization established in the US as a 501(c)(3) non-profit.

Django's primary goal is to ease the creation of complex, database-driven websites. The framework emphasizes reusability and "pluggability" of components, less code, low coupling, rapid development, and the principle of don't repeat yourself. Python is used throughout, even for settings, files, and data models. Django also provides an optional administrative create, read, update and delete interface that is generated dynamically through introspection and configured via admin models.

Some well-known sites that use Django include Instagram, Mozilla, Disqus, Bitbucket, Nextdoor, and Clubhouse.

== History ==
Django was created in the autumn of 2003, when the web programmers at the Lawrence Journal-World newspaper, Adrian Holovaty and Simon Willison, began using Python to build applications. Jacob Kaplan-Moss was hired early in Django's development shortly before Willison's internship ended. It was released publicly under a BSD license in July 2005. The framework was named after guitarist Django Reinhardt. Holovaty is a romani jazz guitar player inspired in part by Reinhardt's music.

In June 2008, it was announced that a newly formed Django Software Foundation (DSF) would maintain Django in the future.

== Features ==
=== Components ===
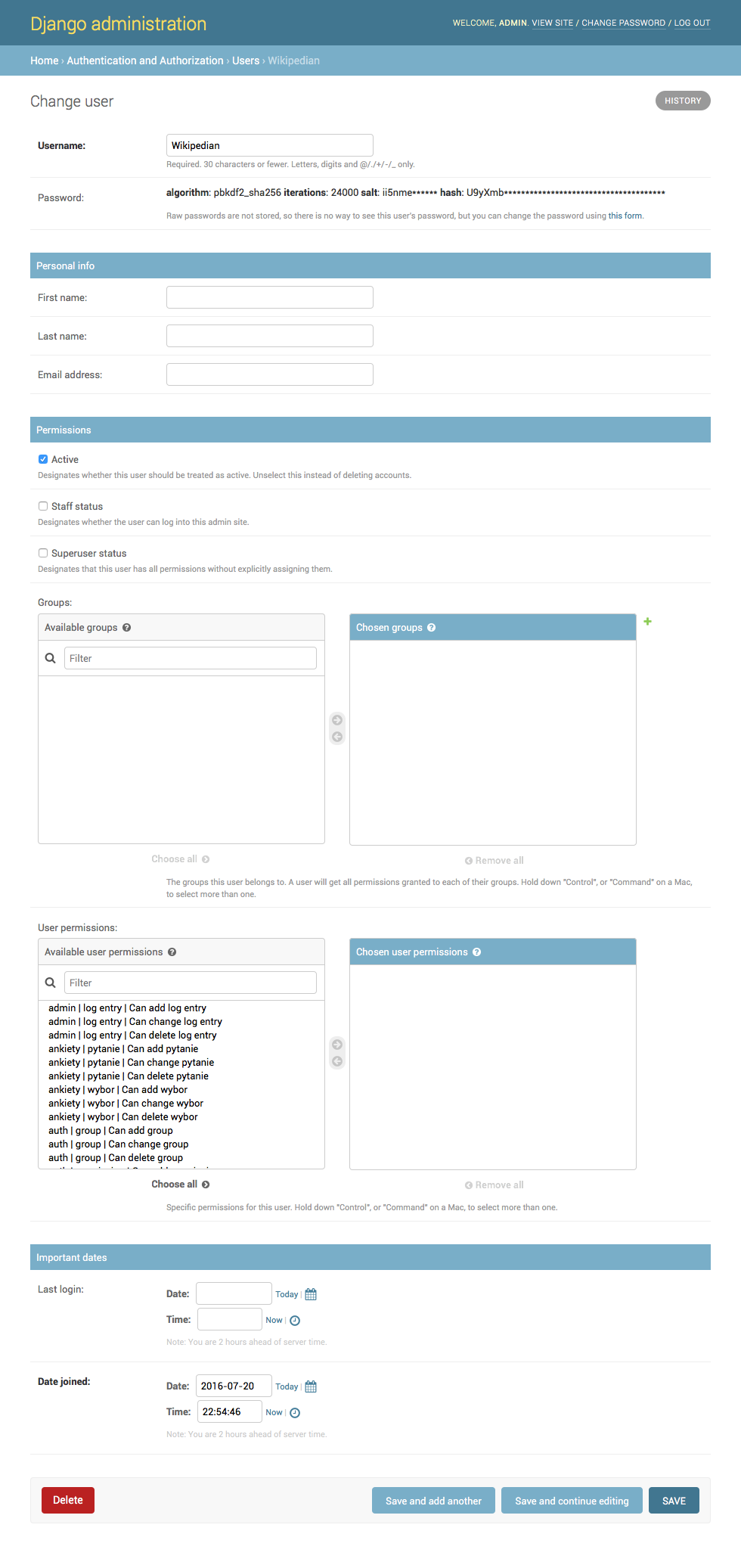
Screenshot of the Django admin interface for modifying a user account

Despite having its own nomenclature, such as naming the callable objects generating the HTTP responses "views", the core Django framework can be seen as an MVC architecture. It consists of an object–relational mapper (ORM) that mediates between data models (defined as Python classes) and a relational database ("Model"), a system for processing HTTP requests with a web templating system ("View"), and a regular-expression-based URL dispatcher ("Controller").

Also included in the core framework are:

- a lightweight and standalone web server for development and testing
- a form serialization and validation system that can translate between HTML forms and values suitable for storage in the database
- a template system that utilizes the concept of inheritance borrowed from object-oriented programming
- a caching framework that can use any of several cache methods
- support for middleware classes that can intervene at various stages of request processing and carry out custom functions
- an internal dispatcher system that allows components of an application to communicate events to each other via pre-defined signals
- an internationalization system, including translations of Django's own components into a variety of languages
- a serialization system that can produce and read XML and/or JSON representations of Django model instances
- a system for extending the capabilities of the template engine
- an interface to Python's built-in unit test framework

=== Bundled applications ===
The main Django distribution also bundles a number of applications in its "contrib" package, including:

- an extensible authentication system
- the dynamic administrative interface
- tools for generating RSS and Atom syndication feeds
- a "Sites" framework that allows one Django installation to run multiple websites, each with their own content and applications
- tools for generating Sitemaps
- built-in mitigation for cross-site request forgery, cross-site scripting, SQL injection, password cracking and other typical web attacks, most of them turned on by default
- a framework for creating geographic information system (GIS) applications

=== Extensibility ===
Django's configuration system allows third-party code to be plugged into a regular project, provided that it follows the reusable app conventions. More than 5000 packages are available to extend the framework's original behavior, providing solutions to issues the original tool didn't tackle: registration, search, API provision and consumption, CMS, etc.

This extensibility is, however, mitigated by internal components' dependencies. While the Django philosophy implies loose coupling, the template filters and tags assume one engine implementation, and both the auth and admin bundled applications require the use of the internal ORM. None of these filters or bundled apps are mandatory to run a Django project, but reusable apps tend to depend on them, encouraging developers to keep using the official stack in order to benefit fully from the apps ecosystem.

=== Server arrangements ===
Django can be run on ASGI or WSGI-compliant web servers. Django officially supports five database backends: PostgreSQL, MySQL, MariaDB, SQLite, and Oracle. Microsoft SQL Server can be used with mssql-django.

== Version history ==
The Django team will occasionally designate certain releases to be "long-term support" (LTS) releases. LTS releases will get security and data loss fixes applied for a guaranteed period of time, typically 3+ years, regardless of the pace of releases afterwards.

Version	Release date	End of mainstream support	End of extended support	Notes
0.90	16 Nov 2005			
0.91	11 Jan 2006			"new-admin"
0.95	29 Jul 2006			"magic removal"
0.96	23 Mar 2007			"newforms", testing tools
1.0	3 Sep 2008			API stability, decoupled admin, unicode
1.1	29 Jul 2009			Aggregates, transaction based tests
1.2	17 May 2010			Multiple db connections, CSRF, model validation
1.3	23 Mar 2011	23 Mar 2012	26 Feb 2013	Class based views, staticfiles
1.4 LTS	23 Mar 2012	26 Feb 2013	1 Oct 2015	Time zones, in browser testing, app templates.
1.5	26 Feb 2013	6 Nov 2013	2 Sep 2014	Python 3 Support, configurable user model
1.6	6 Nov 2013	2 Sep 2014	1 Apr 2015	Dedicated to Malcolm Tredinnick, db transaction management, connection pooling.
1.7	2 Sep 2014	1 Apr 2015	1 Dec 2015	Migrations, application loading and configuration.
1.8 LTS	1 Apr 2015	1 Dec 2015	1 Apr 2018	Native support for multiple template engines. Support ended on 1 April 2018
1.9	1 Dec 2015	1 Aug 2016	4 Apr 2017	Automatic password validation. New styling for admin interface.
1.10	1 Aug 2016	4 Apr 2017	2 Dec 2017	Full text search for PostgreSQL. New-style middleware.
1.11 LTS	4 Apr 2017	2 Dec 2017	1 Apr 2020	Last version to support Python 2.7. Support ended on 1 April 2020
2.0	2 Dec 2017	1 Aug 2018	1 Apr 2019	First Python 3-only release, Simplified URL routing syntax, Mobile friendly admin.
2.1	1 Aug 2018	1 Apr 2019	2 Dec 2019	Model "view" permission.
2.2 LTS	1 Apr 2019	2 Dec 2019	11 Apr 2022	Security release.
3.0	2 Dec 2019	3 Aug 2020	6 Apr 2020	ASGI support
3.1	4 Aug 2020	6 Apr 2020	7 Dec 2021	Asynchronous views and middleware
3.2 LTS	6 Apr 2021	7 Dec 2021	April 2024	Tracking many to many relationships, added support for Python 3.11
4.0	7 Dec 2021	3 Aug 2022	April 2023	Support for pytz is now deprecated and will be removed in Django 5.0.
4.1	3 Aug 2022	April 2023	December 2023	Asynchronous ORM interface, CSRF_COOKIE_MASKED setting, outputting a form, like {{ form }}
4.2 LTS	3 Apr 2023	4 Dec 2023	Apr 2026	Psycopg 3 support, ENGINE as django.db.backends.postgresql supports both libraries.
5.0	4 Dec 2023	7 Aug 2024	2 Apr 2025	Facet filters in the admin, Simplified templates for form field rendering
5.1	7 Aug 2024	2 Apr 2025	Dec 2025	Added support for Python 3.13. Added support for PostgreSQL connection pools.
5.2 LTS	2 Apr 2025	Dec 2025	Apr 2028	Automatic model import in shell, support for composite primary keys
6.0	3 Dec 2025	August 2026	April 2027	Content Security Policy (CSP) built-in support, template partials, background tasks, Python 3.14 support.
6.1	5 Aug 2026	Apr 2027	Dec 2027	Model field fetch modes, database-level on_delete, MAILERS setting (multiple email backends)
6.2 LTS	Apr 2027			
Unsupported Supported Latest version Preview version Future version

== Community ==
=== DjangoCon ===
There is a semiannual conference for Django developers and users, named "DjangoCon", that has been held since September 2008. DjangoCon is held annually in Europe, in May or June; while another is held in the United States in August or September, in various cities.

==== United States ====
The 2012 DjangoCon took place in Washington, D.C., from September 3 to 8.

2013 DjangoCon was held in Chicago at the Hyatt Regency Hotel and the post-conference Sprints were hosted at Digital Bootcamp, computer training center.

The 2014 DjangoCon US returned to Portland, OR from August 30 to 6 September.

The 2015 DjangoCon US was held in Austin, TX from September 6 to 11 at the AT&T Executive Center.

The 2016 DjangoCon US was held in Philadelphia, PA at The Wharton School of the University of Pennsylvania from July 17 to 22.

The 2017 DjangoCon US was held in Spokane, WA; in 2018 DjangoCon US was held in San Diego, CA. DjangoCon US 2019 was held again in San Diego, CA from September 22 to 27.

DjangoCon 2021 took place virtually and in 2022, DjangoCon US returned to San Diego from October 16 to 21. DjangoCon US 2023 was held from October 16 to 20 at the Durham, NC convention center and DjangoCon US 2024 took place also in Durham in September 22 to 27.

DjangoCon US 2025 was held from September 8 to 12 in Chicago, Illinois.

==== Europe ====
Year	Title	Country	City	Date	Sprints	Venue type
2009	EuroDjangoCon 2009	Czechia	Prague	May 4-6	May 7-8	
2010	DjangoCon Europe 2010	Germany	Berlin	May 24-26	May 27-28	
2011	DjangoCon Europe 2011	Netherlands	Amsterdam	June 6-8	June 9-10	
2012	DjangoCon Europe 2012	Switzerland	Zurich	June 4-6	June 7-8	
2013	DjangoCon Europe 2013	Poland	Warsaw	May 15-17	May 18-19	Circus tent
2014	DjangoCon Europe 2014	France	Toulon, Île des Embiez	May 13-15	May 16-17	Island
2015	DjangoCon Europe 2015	Wales	Cardiff	June 1-3 (+May 31 as intro day)	June 4-5	City Hall
2016	DjangoCon Europe 2016	Hungary	Budapest	March 30-April 1	April 2-3	Music Center
2017	DjangoCon Europe 2017	Italy	Florence	April 3-5	April 6-7	Cinema
2018	DjangoCon Europe 2018	Germany	Heidelberg	May 23-25	May 26-27	City Hall
2019	DjangoCon Europe 2019	Denmark	Copenhagen	April 10-12	April 13-14	Circus school
2020	DjangoCon Europe 2020	Portugal (virtual)	-	September 18-19		Virtual
2021	DjangoCon Europe 2021	Portugal (virtual)	-	June 2-4	June 5-6	Virtual
2022	DjangoCon Europe 2022	Portugal	Porto	September 21-23	September 24-25	Conference center
2023	DjangoCon Europe 2023	Scotland	Edinburgh	May 29-May 31	June 1-2	Conference center
2024	DjangoCon Europe 2024	Spain	Vigo	June 5-7	June 8-9	Conference center
2025	DjangoCon Europe 2025	Ireland	Dublin	April 23-25	April 26-27	Hotel
2026	DjangoCon Europe 2026	Greece	Athens	April 15-17	April 18-19	Music Conservatory
2027	DjangoCon Europe 2027	Austria	Innsbruck	February 17-19	February 20-21	University

==== Australia ====
Django mini-conferences are usually held every year as part of the Australian Python Conference 'PyCon AU'. Previously, these mini-conferences have been held in:

- Hobart, Australia, in July 2013,
- Brisbane, Australia, in August 2014 and 2015,
- Melbourne, Australia in August 2016 and 2017, and
- Sydney, Australia, in August 2018 and 2019.

==== Africa ====
The first DjangoCon Africa was held in Zanzibar, Tanzania, from 6 to 11 November 2023. The event hosted approximately 200 attendees from 22 countries, including 103 women. The conference featured 26 talks on topics such as software development, education, careers, accessibility, and agriculture, often highlighting perspectives from across the African continent. Future editions of the conference are planned, with details available on the official website

=== Community groups & programs ===
Django has spawned user groups and meetups around the world, a notable group is the Django Girls organization, which began in Poland but now has had events in 91 countries.

Another initiative is Djangonaut Space, a mentorship program aimed at supporting new contributors to the Django ecosystem. The program pairs experienced mentors with developers to guide them through making meaningful contributions to Django and its community. It emphasizes long-term engagement, inclusion, and collaborative open-source development.

== Ports to other languages ==
Programmers have ported Django's template engine design from Python to other languages, providing decent cross-platform support. Some of these options are more direct ports; others, though inspired by Django and retaining its concepts, take the liberty to deviate from Django's design:

- Liquid for Ruby
- Template::Swig for Perl
- Twig for PHP and JavaScript
- Jinja for Python
- ErlyDTL for Erlang

== CMSs based on Django Framework ==
Django as a framework is capable of building a complete CMS. Some dedicated CMS projects are based upon Django:

- Django CMS
- Wagtail
- Mezzanine

== See also ==
- FastAPI
- Flask
- Pylons project
- Web2py
- Tornado
- List of open-source web frameworks
- List of rich web application frameworks
- Ruby on Rails
- Comparison of web frameworks

== Bibliography ==
- Jaiswal, Sanjeev; Kumar, Ratan (22 June 2015), Learning Django Web Development (1st ed.), Packt, p. 405, ISBN 978-1783984404
- Ravindrun, Arun (31 March 2015), Django Design Patterns and Best Practices (1st ed.), Packt, p. 180, ISBN 978-1783986644
- Osborn, Tracy (May 2015), Hello Web App (1st ed.), Tracy Osborn, p. 142, ISBN 978-0986365911
- Bendoraitis, Aidas (October 2014), Web Development with Django Cookbook (1st ed.), Packt, p. 294, ISBN 978-1783286898
- Baumgartner, Peter; Malet, Yann (2015), High Performance Django (1st ed.), Lincoln Loop, p. 184, ISBN 978-1508748120
- Elman, Julia; Lavin, Mark (2014), Lightweight Django (1st ed.), O'Reilly Media, p. 246, ISBN 978-1491945940
- Percival, Harry (2014), Test-Driven Development with Python (1st ed.), O'Reilly Media, p. 480, ISBN 978-1449364823, archived from the original on 16 July 2017
