= Tube sound =

Characteristic quality of sounds from vacuum tube amplifiers

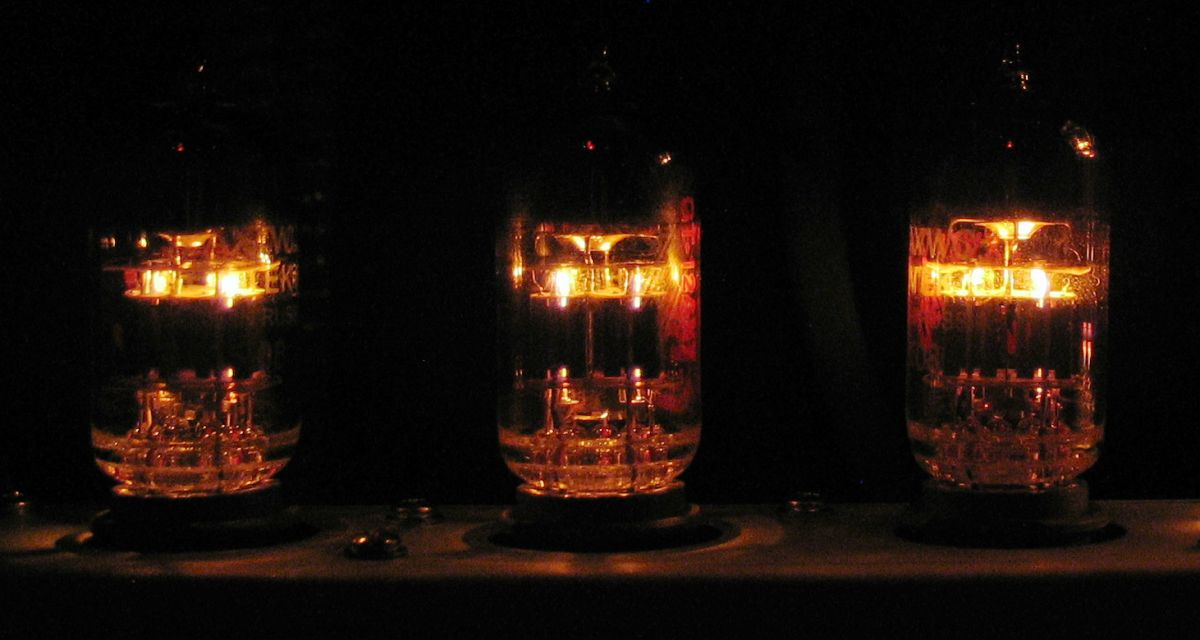
Vacuum tubes glowing inside the preamp section of a modern guitar amplifier

Tube sound (or valve sound) is the characteristic sound associated with a vacuum tube amplifier. The concept of tube sound did not exist prior to the invention of transistors, as all electronic amplification of audio signals used vacuum tubes. After the introduction of solid-state amplifiers, tube sound became the logical complement of transistor sound, which had some negative connotations due to crossover distortion in early transistor amplifiers. Modern solid-state amplifiers are made with a neutral sound compared to tube amplifiers; thus, tube sound typically refers to euphonic distortion now associated with tube amplification. The audible significance of tube amplification on audio signals is a subject of continuing debate among audio enthusiasts.

Even though tube amplifiers are generally more expensive than solid-state devices, tube instrument amplifiers are still preferred by many musicians for electric guitar, electric bass, and keyboards. Additionally, some audiophiles prefer tube amplification for listening to prerecorded music.

Playing dynamics with an electric guitar and a tube overdrive
Demonstration of the dynamics on electric guitar with a tube overdrive set to a crunch sound. Barely touching the strings produces an almost clean sound; harder playing results in distortion.

== History ==
Before the commercial introduction of transistors in the 1950s, electronic amplifiers used vacuum tubes (known in the United Kingdom as valves). By the 1960s, solid state (transistorized) amplification had become more common because of its smaller size, lighter weight, lower heat production, and improved reliability. Tube amplifiers have retained a loyal following amongst some audiophiles and musicians. Some tube designs command very high prices, and tube amplifiers have been going through a revival since Chinese and Russian markets have opened to global trade—tube production never went out of vogue in these countries. Many transistor-based audio power amplifiers use MOSFET (metal–oxide–semiconductor field-effect transistor) devices in their power sections, because their distortion curve is more tube-like.

== Musical instrument amplification ==
Some musicians prefer the distortion characteristics of tubes over transistors for electric guitar, bass, and other instrument amplifiers. In this case, generating deliberate (and in the case of electric guitars often considerable) audible distortion or overdrive is usually the goal. The term can also be used to describe the sound created by specially designed transistor amplifiers or digital modeling devices that try to closely emulate the characteristics of the tube sound.

The tube sound is often subjectively described as having a warmth and richness, but the source of this is by no means agreed on. Possible explanations mention non-linear clipping, or the higher levels of second-order harmonic distortion in single-ended designs, resulting from the tube interacting with the inductance of the output transformer.

== Harmonic content and distortion ==
Triodes (and MOSFETs) produce a monotonically decaying harmonic distortion spectrum. Even-order harmonics and odd-order harmonics are both natural number multiples of the input frequency.

Psychoacoustics research suggests that high-order harmonics are more offensive than low-order. For this reason, distortion measurements should weight audible high-order harmonics more than low. The importance of high-order harmonics suggests that distortion should be regarded in terms of the complete series or of the composite waveform that this series represents. It has been shown that weighting the harmonics by the square of the order correlates well with subjective listening tests. Weighting the distortion waveform proportionally to the square of the frequency gives a measure of the reciprocal of the radius of curvature of the waveform, and is therefore related to the sharpness of any corners on it. Based on said discovery, highly sophisticated methods of weighting of distortion harmonics have been developed. Since they concentrate in the origins of the distortion, they are mostly useful for the engineers who develop and design audio amplifiers, but on the other hand they may be difficult to use for the reviewers who only measure the output.

Some subjective aspects of audio perception is difficult to address with purely objective audio measurements. This is the case when designing or reviewing instrument amplifiers, as they tend to have design goals of very different than that of HiFi audio amplifiers. HiFi design largely concentrates on improving performance of objectively measurable variables. Instrument amplifier design largely concentrates on subjective issues, such as pleasantness of a certain type of tone. Fine examples are cases of distortion or frequency response: HiFi design tries to minimize distortion and focuses on eliminating offensive harmonics. It also aims for an ideally flat response. Musical instrument amplifier design deliberately introduces distortion and great non-linearities in frequency response. Former offensiveness of certain types of harmonics becomes a highly subjective topic, along with preferences towards certain types of frequency responses (whether flat or un-flat).

Push–pull amplifiers use two nominally identical gain devices in tandem. One consequence of this is that all even-order harmonic products cancel, allowing only odd-order distortion. This is because a push–pull amplifier has a symmetric (odd symmetry) transfer characteristic. Power amplifiers are of the push–pull type to avoid the inefficiency of Class A amplifiers.

A single-ended amplifier will generally produce even as well as odd harmonics. A particularly famous research about tube sound compared a selection of single-ended tube microphone preamplifiers to a selection of push–pull transistorized microphone preamplifiers. The difference in harmonic patterns of these two topologies has henceforth been often incorrectly attributed to the difference between tube and solid-state devices (or even the amplifier class). Push–pull tube amplifiers can be run in class A (rarely), AB, or B. Also, a class-B amplifier may have crossover distortion that will be typically high order and thus sonically very undesirable indeed.

The distortion content of class-A circuits (SE or PP) typically monotonically reduces as the signal level is reduced, asymptotic to zero during quiet passages of music. For this reason, class-A amplifiers are especially desired for classical and acoustic music since the distortion relative to signal decreases as the music gets quieter. Class-A amplifiers measure best at low power. Class-AB and B amplifiers measure best just below max rated power.

Loudspeakers present a reactive load to an amplifier (capacitance, inductance and resistance). This impedance may vary in value with signal frequency and amplitude. This variable loading affects the amplifier's performance both because the amplifier has nonzero output impedance (it cannot keep its output voltage perfectly constant when the speaker load varies) and because the phase of the speaker load can change the stability margin of the amplifier. The influence of the speaker impedance is different between tube amplifiers and transistor amplifiers. The reason is that tube amplifiers normally use output transformers and cannot use much negative feedback due to phase problems in transformer circuits. Notable exceptions are various OTL (output-transformerless) tube amplifiers, pioneered by Julius Futterman in the 1950s, or somewhat rarer tube amplifiers that replace the impedance matching transformer with additional (often, though not necessarily, transistorized) circuitry in order to eliminate parasitics and musically unrelated magnetic distortions. In addition to that, many solid-state amplifiers, designed specifically to amplify electric instruments such as guitars or bass guitars, employ current feedback circuitry. This circuitry increases the amplifier's output impedance, resulting in a response similar to that of tube amplifiers.

The design of speaker crossover networks and other electro-mechanical properties may result in a speaker with a very uneven impedance curve, for a nominal 8 Ω speaker, being as low as 6 Ω at some places and as high as 30–50 Ω elsewhere in the curve. An amplifier with little or no negative feedback will always perform poorly when faced with a speaker where little attention was paid to the impedance curve.

== Design comparison ==
There has been considerable debate over the characteristics of tubes versus bipolar junction transistors. Triodes and MOSFETs have certain similarities in their transfer characteristics. Later forms of the tube, the tetrode and pentode, have quite different characteristics that are in some ways similar to the bipolar transistor. Yet MOSFET amplifier circuits typically do not reproduce tube sound any more than typical bipolar designs. The reason is circuit differences between a typical tube design and a typical MOSFET design.

=== Input impedance ===
A characteristic feature of most tube amplifier designs is the high input impedance (typically 100 kΩ or more) in modern designs and as much as 1 MΩ in classic designs. The input impedance of the amplifier is a load for the source device. Even for some modern music reproduction devices, the recommended load impedance is over 50 kΩ. This implies that the input of an average tube amplifier is a problem-free load for music signal sources. By contrast, some transistor amplifiers for home use have lower input impedances, as low as 15 kΩ. Since it is possible to use high output impedance devices due to the high input impedance, other factors may need to be accounted for, such as cable capacitance and microphonics.

=== Output impedance ===
Loudspeakers usually load audio amplifiers. In audio history, nearly all loudspeakers have been electrodynamic loudspeakers. There also exists a minority of electrostatic loudspeakers and some other more exotic loudspeakers. Electrodynamic loudspeakers transform electric current into force and force into acceleration of the diaphragm, which causes sound pressure. Due to the principle of an electrodynamic speaker, most loudspeaker drivers ought to be driven by an electric current signal. The current signal drives the electrodynamic speaker more accurately, causing less distortion than a voltage signal.

In an ideal current or transconductance amplifier, the output impedance approaches infinity. Practically all commercial audio amplifiers are voltage amplifiers. Conversely, their output impedances have been intentionally developed to approach zero. Due to the nature of vacuum tubes and audio transformers, the output impedance of an average tube amplifier is usually considerably higher than that of modern audio amplifiers produced completely without vacuum tubes or audio transformers. Most tube amplifiers, with their higher output impedance, are less ideal voltage amplifiers than the solid-state voltage amplifiers with their smaller output impedance.

While the high output impedance of tube amplifiers is often discussed in terms of altering frequency response, some audio engineering literature suggests it can also lead to a reduction in certain types of loudspeaker-induced distortion. In a conventional low-impedance (voltage-driven) system, the back-electromotive force generated by the loudspeaker's voice coil modulates the current, causing non-linear distortion. Because a tube amplifier's higher output impedance restricts this reverse current, it forces the circuit to behave somewhat more like a current source. According to research into loudspeaker current-drive, this can linearize the force applied to the voice coil, thereby reducing electro-mechanical distortions, such as thermal compression and position-dependent distortion, rather than merely introducing "euphonic" harmonic distortion from the tubes themselves.

=== Soft clipping ===
Soft clipping is a very important aspect of tube sound, especially for guitar amplifiers. A hi-fi amplifier should not normally ever be driven into clipping. The harmonics added to the signal are of lower energy with soft clipping than hard clipping. However, soft clipping is not exclusive to tubes. It can be simulated in transistor circuits (below the point at which real hard clipping would occur). (See "Intentional distortion" section.)

Large amounts of global negative feedback are not available in tube circuits, due to phase shift in the output transformer, and lack of sufficient gain without large numbers of tubes. With lower feedback, distortion is higher and predominantly of low order. The onset of clipping is also gradual. Large amounts of feedback, allowed by transformerless circuits with many active devices, lead to numerically lower distortion but with more high harmonics, and a more abrupt transition to clipping. As input increases, the feedback uses the extra gain to ensure that the output follows it accurately until the amplifier has no more gain to give and the output saturates.

However, phase shift is largely an issue only with global feedback loops. Design architectures with local feedback can be used to compensate for the lack of global negative feedback magnitude. Design selectivism is again a trend to observe: designers of sound-producing devices may find the lack of feedback and resulting higher distortion beneficial; designers of sound-reproducing devices with low distortion have often employed local feedback loops.

Soft clipping is also not a product of lack of feedback alone: Tubes have different characteristic curves. Factors such as bias affect the load line and clipping characteristics. Fixed and cathode-biased amplifiers behave and clip differently under overdrive. The type of phase inverter circuitry can also greatly affect the softness (or lack of it) of clipping; the long-tailed pair circuit, for example, has a softer transition to clipping than a cathodyne. The coupling of the phase inverter and power tubes is also important, since certain types of coupling arrangements (e.g., transformer coupling) can drive power tubes to class AB2, while some other types can't.

In the recording industry, and especially with microphone amplifiers, it has been shown that amplifiers are often overloaded by signal transients. Russell O. Hamm, an engineer working for Walter Sear at Sear Sound Studios, wrote in 1973 that there is a major difference between the harmonic distortion components of a signal with greater than 10% distortion that had been amplified with three methods: tubes, transistors, or operational amplifiers.

Mastering engineer R. Steven Mintz wrote a rebuttal to Hamm's paper, saying that the circuit design was of paramount importance, more than tubes vs. solid state components.

Hamm's paper was also countered by Dwight O. Monteith Jr and Richard R. Flowers in their article "Transistors Sound Better Than Tubes", which presented transistor mic preamplifier design that actually reacted to transient overloading similarly as the limited selection of tube preamplifiers tested by Hamm. Monteith and Flowers said: "In conclusion, the high voltage transistor preamplifier presented here supports the viewpoint of Mintz: 'In the field analysis, the characteristics of a typical system using transistors depends on the design, as is the case in tube circuits. A particular 'sound' may be incurred or avoided at the designer's pleasure, no matter what active devices he uses.'"

In other words, soft clipping is not exclusive to vacuum tubes or even an inherent property of them. In practice, the clipping characteristics are largely dictated by the entire circuitry and as so they can range from very soft to very hard, depending on the circuitry. The same applies to both vacuum tube and solid-state-based circuitry. For example, solid-state circuitry such as operational transconductance amplifiers operated open loop, or MOSFET cascades of CMOS inverters, are frequently used in commercial applications to generate softer clipping than what is provided by generic triode gain stages. In fact, the generic triode gain stages can be observed to clip rather hard if their output is scrutinized with an oscilloscope.

=== Bandwidth ===
Early tube amplifiers often had limited response bandwidth, in part due to the characteristics of the inexpensive passive components then available. In power amplifiers, most limitations come from the output transformer; low frequencies are limited by primary inductance and high frequencies by leakage inductance and capacitance. Another limitation is in the combination of high output impedance, decoupling capacitor and grid resistor, which acts as a high-pass filter. If interconnections are made from long cables (for example, guitar to amp input), a high source impedance with high cable capacitance will act as a low-pass filter.

Modern premium components make it easy to produce amplifiers that are essentially flat over the audio band, with less than 3 dB attenuation at 6 Hz and 70 kHz, well outside the audible range.

=== Negative feedback ===
Typical (non-OTL) tube power amplifiers could not use as much negative feedback (NFB) as transistor amplifiers due to the large phase shifts caused by the output transformers and their lower stage gains. While the absence of NFB greatly increases harmonic distortion, it avoids instability, as well as slew rate and bandwidth limitations imposed by dominant-pole compensation in transistor amplifiers. However, the effects of using low feedback principally apply only to circuits where significant phase shifts are an issue (e.g., power amplifiers). In preamplifier stages, high amounts of negative feedback can easily be employed. Such designs are commonly found in many tube-based applications aiming for higher fidelity.

On the other hand, the dominant pole compensation in transistor amplifiers is precisely controlled: exactly as much of it can be applied as needed to strike a good compromise for the given application.

The effect of dominant pole compensation is that the gain is reduced at higher frequencies. There is increasingly less NFB at high frequencies due to the reduced loop gain.

In audio amplifiers, the bandwidth limitations introduced by compensation are still far beyond the audio frequency range, and the slew rate limitations can be configured such that full amplitude 20 kHz signal can be reproduced without the signal encountering slew rate distortion, which is not even necessary for reproducing actual audio material.

=== Power supplies ===
Early tube amplifiers had power supplies based on rectifier tubes. These supplies were unregulated, a practice that continues to this day in transistor amplifier designs. The typical anode supply was a rectifier, perhaps half-wave, a choke (inductor) and a filter capacitor. When the tube amplifier was operated at high volume, due to the high impedance of the rectifier tubes, the power supply voltage would dip as the amplifier drew more current (assuming class AB), reducing power output and causing signal modulation. The dipping effect is known as sag. Sag may be a desirable effect for some electric guitarists when compared with hard clipping. As the amplifier load or output increases, this voltage drop will increase distortion of the output signal. Sometimes this sag effect is desirable for guitar amplification.

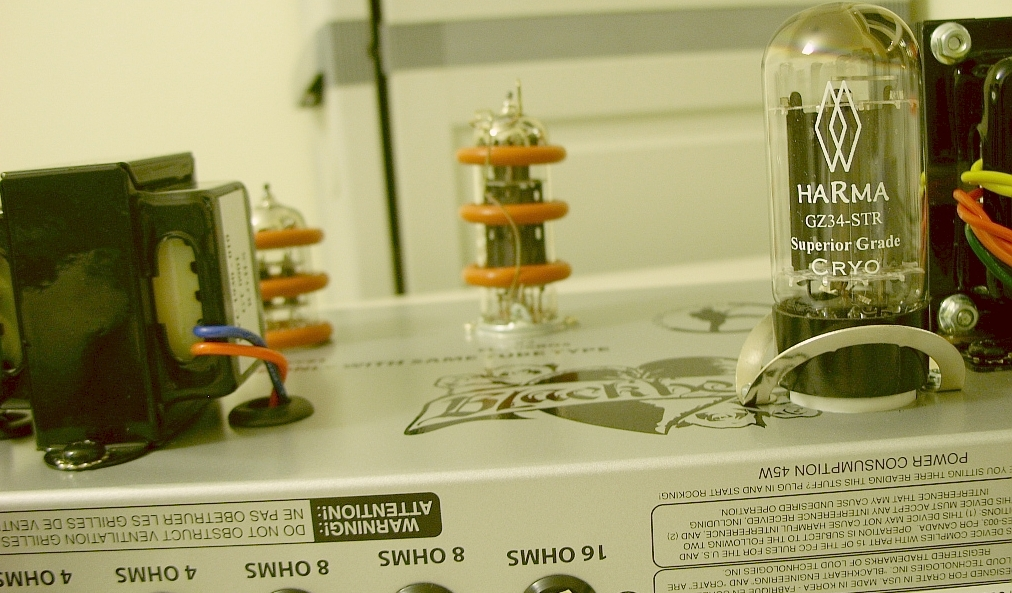
Blackheart 5W single-ended class-A guitar amplifier chassis with an additional GZ34 valve rectifier modification installed

With added resistance in series with the high-voltage supply, silicon rectifiers can emulate the voltage sag of a tube rectifier. The resistance can be switched in when required.

Electric guitar amplifiers often use a class-AB_{1} amplifier. In a class-A stage, the average current drawn from the supply is constant with signal level; consequently, it does not cause supply line sag until the clipping point is reached. Other audible effects due to using a tube rectifier with this amplifier class are unlikely.

Unlike their solid-state equivalents, tube rectifiers require time to warm up before they can supply B+/HT voltages. This delay can protect rectifier-supplied vacuum tubes from cathode damage due to application of B+/HT voltages before the tubes have reached their correct operating temperature by the tube's built-in heater.

=== Class A ===
The benefit of all class-A amplifiers is the absence of crossover distortion. This crossover distortion was found especially annoying after the first silicon-transistor class-B and class-AB transistor amplifiers arrived on the consumer market. Earlier germanium-based designs with the much lower turn-on voltage of this technology and the non-linear response curves of the devices had not shown large amounts of crossover distortion. Although crossover distortion is very fatiguing to the ear and perceptible in listening tests, it is also almost invisible (until looked for) in the traditional Total harmonic distortion (THD) measurements of that epoch. It should be pointed out that this reference is somewhat ironic given its publication date of 1952. As such, it most certainly refers to ear fatigue distortion commonly found in existing tube-type designs; the world's first prototype transistorized hi-fi amplifier did not appear until 1955.

=== Push–pull amplifiers ===
A class-A push–pull amplifier produces low distortion for any given level of applied feedback, and also cancels the flux in the transformer cores, so this topology is often seen by HIFI-audio enthusiasts and do-it-yourself builders as the ultimate engineering approach to the tube hi-fi amplifier for use with normal speakers. Output power of as high as 15 watts can be achieved even with classic tubes such as the 2A3 or 18 watts from the type 45. Classic pentodes such as the EL34 and KT88 can output as much as 60 and 100 watts, respectively. Special types, such as the V1505, can be used in designs rated at up to 1100 watts. See "An Approach to Audio Frequency Amplifier Design", a collection of reference designs originally published by G.E.C.

=== Single-ended triode (SET) amplifiers ===
SET amplifiers show poor measurements for distortion with a resistive load, have low output power, are inefficient, have poor damping factors and high measured harmonic distortion. But they perform somewhat better in dynamic and impulse response.

The triode, despite being the oldest signal amplification device, can also (depending on the device in question) have a more linear no-feedback transfer characteristic than more advanced devices such as beam tetrodes and pentodes.

All amplifiers, regardless of class, components, or topology, have some measure of distortion. This mainly harmonic distortion is a unique pattern of a simple and monotonically decaying series of harmonics, dominated by modest levels of second harmonic. The result is like adding the same tone one octave higher in the case of second-order harmonics, and one octave plus one fifth higher for third-order harmonics. The added harmonic tone is lower in amplitude, at about 1–5% or less in a no-feedback amp at full power and rapidly decreasing at lower output levels. Hypothetically, a single-ended power amplifier's second harmonic distortion might reduce similar harmonic distortion in a single driver loudspeaker if their harmonic distortions were equal and the amplifier was connected to the speaker so that the distortions would neutralize each other.

SETs usually only produce about 2 watt (W) for a 2A3 tube amp to 8 W for a 300B up to the practical maximum of 40 W for an 805 tube amp. The resulting sound pressure level depends on the sensitivity of the loudspeaker and the size and acoustics of the room, as well as amplifier power output. Their low power also makes them ideal for use as preamps. SET amps have a power consumption of a minimum of 8 times the stated stereo power. For example, a 10 W stereo SET uses a minimum of 80 W, and typically 100 W.

=== Single-ended pentode and tetrode amplifiers ===
The special feature among tetrodes and pentodes is the possibility to obtain ultra-linear or distributed load operation with an appropriate output transformer. In practice, in addition to loading the plate terminal, distributed loading (of which ultra-linear circuit is a specific form) also distributes the load to the cathode and screen terminals of the tube. An Ultra-linear connection and distributed loading are both, in essence, negative feedback methods, which enable less harmonic distortion along with other characteristics associated with negative feedback. Ultra-linear topology has mostly been associated with amplifier circuits based on research by D. Hafler and H. Keroes of Dynaco fame. Distributed loading (in general and in various forms) has been employed by the likes of McIntosh and Audio Research.

=== Class AB ===
The majority of modern commercial hi-fi amplifier designs have until recently used class-AB topology (with more or less pure low-level class-A capability depending on the standing bias current used), in order to deliver greater power and efficiency, typically 12–25 watts and higher. Contemporary designs normally include at least some negative feedback. However, class-D topology (which is vastly more efficient than class B) is more and more frequently applied where traditional design would use class AB because of its advantages in both weight and efficiency.

Class-AB push–pull topology is nearly universally used in tube amps for electric guitar applications that produce power of more than about 10 watts.

== Intentional distortion ==
=== Tube sound from transistor amplifiers ===
Some individual characteristics of the tube sound, such as the waveshaping on overdrive, are straightforward to produce in a transistor circuit or digital filter. For more complete simulations, engineers have been successful in developing transistor amplifiers that produce a sound quality very similar to the tube sound. Usually, this involves using a circuit topology similar to that used in tube amplifiers.

More recently, a researcher has introduced the asymmetric cycle harmonic injection (ACHI) method to emulate tube sound with transistors.

Using modern passive components, and modern sources, whether digital or analogue, and wide-band loudspeakers, it is possible to have tube amplifiers with the characteristic wide bandwidth of modern transistor amplifiers, including using push–pull circuits, class AB, and feedback. Some enthusiasts, such as Nelson Pass, have built amplifiers using transistors and MOSFETs that operate in class A, including single ended, and these often have the tube sound.

=== Hybrid amplifiers ===
Tubes are added to solid-state amplifiers to impart characteristics that many people find audibly pleasant, such as Musical Fidelity's use of Nuvistors (tiny triode tubes) to control large bipolar transistors in their NuVista 300 power amp. In America, Moscode and Studio Electric use this method, but use MOSFET transistors for power, rather than bipolar. Pathos, an Italian company, has developed an entire line of hybrid amplifiers.

To demonstrate one aspect of this effect, one may use a light bulb in the feedback loop of an infinite gain multiple feedback (IGMF) circuit. The slow response of the light bulb's resistance (which varies according to temperature) can thus be used to moderate the sound and attain a tube-like soft limiting of the output, though other aspects of the tube sound would not be duplicated in this exercise.

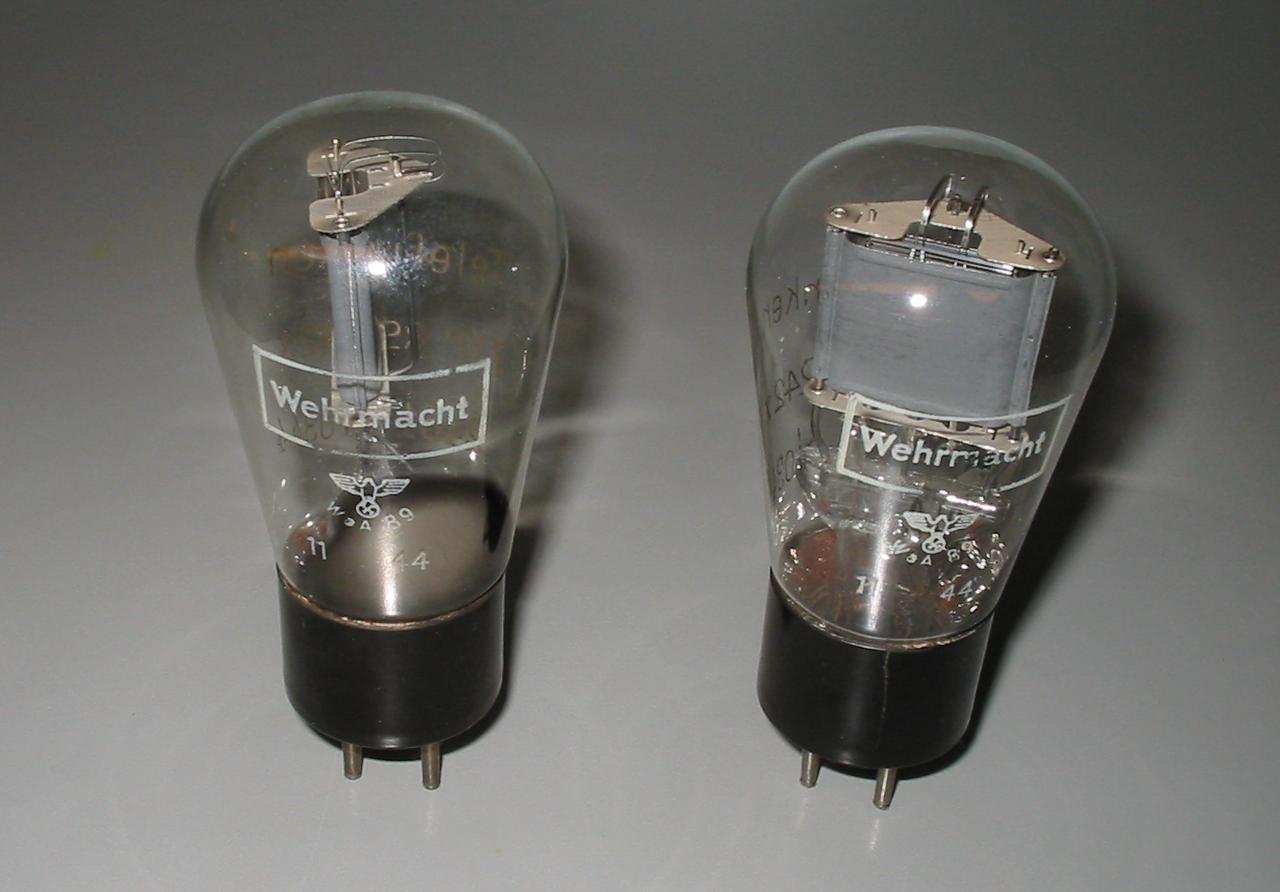
Directly heated triodes

== See also ==
- Audio system measurements
- Boutique amplifier
- British Radio Valve Manufacturers' Association
- Virtual Valve Amplifier
