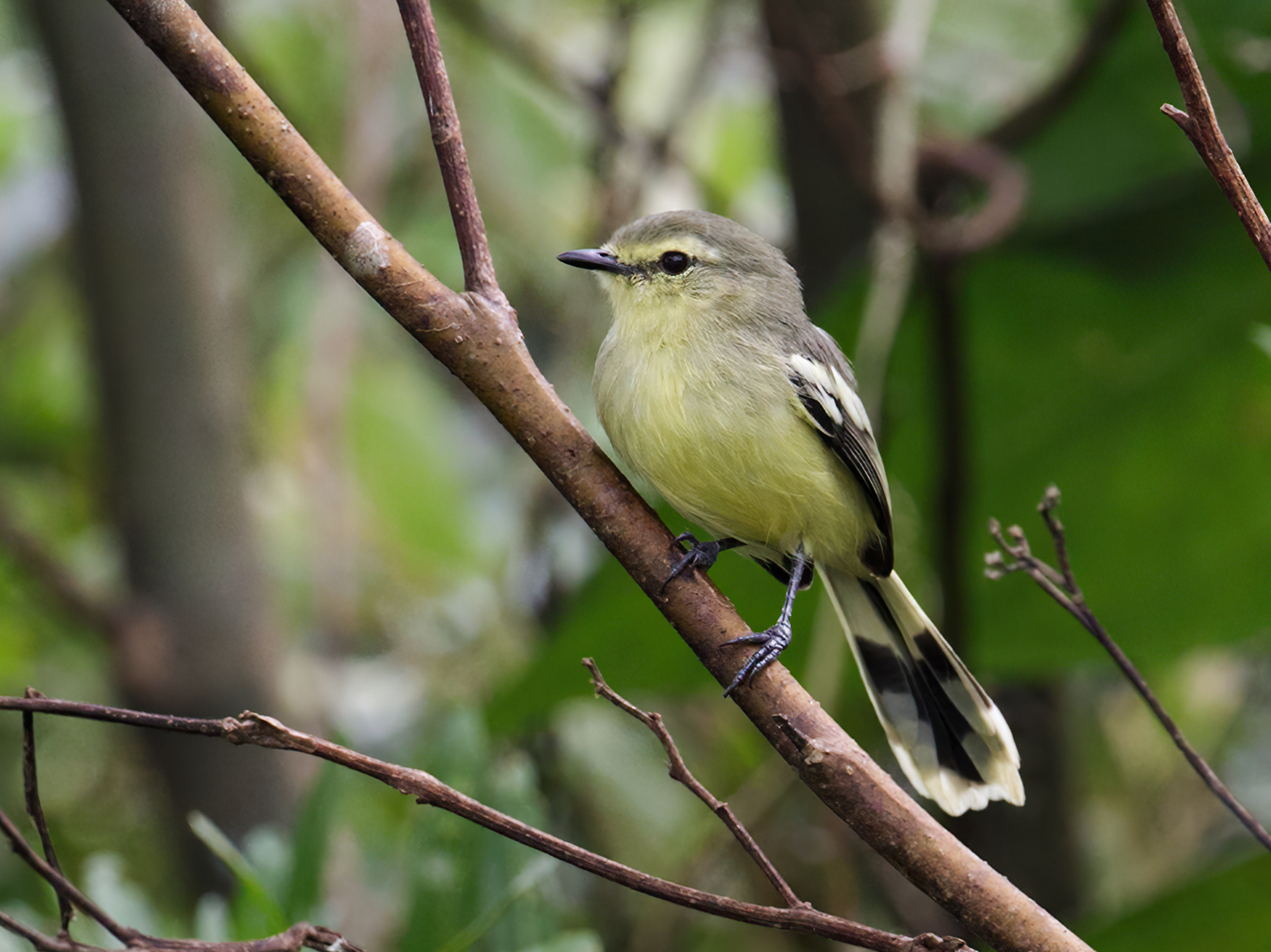
- Lesser wagtail-tyrant

Conservation status
- Least Concern (IUCN 3.1)

Scientific classification
- Kingdom: Animalia
- Phylum: Chordata
- Class: Aves
- Order: Passeriformes
- Family: Tyrannidae
- Genus: Stigmatura
- Species: S. napensis

Binomial name
- Stigmatura napensis Chapman, 1926

= Lesser wagtail-tyrant =

Species of bird

The lesser wagtail-tyrant (Stigmatura napensis) is a species of bird in the family Tyrannidae, the tyrant flycatchers. It is found in Brazil, Colombia, Ecuador, Peru, and Venezuela.

== Taxonomy and systematics ==
What is now the lesser wagtail-tyrant was originally described as Stigmatura budytoides napensis, a subspecies of the greater wagtail-tyrant. What is now the Bahia wagtail-tyrant (S. bahiae) was described as another subspecies at the same time. They were later treated as two subspecies of the lesser wagtail-tyrant. BirdLife International's Handbook of the Birds of the World separated them from each other as monotypic species in 2014. The Clements taxonomy did so in late 2022 and the International Ornithological Committee in early 2023. As of late 2024 the South American Classification Committee of the American Ornithological Society had not adopted the split. A population in the upper Orinoco Basin that is separate from the rest of the species is suspected of being a subspecies or possibly a species.

== Description ==
The lesser wagtail-tyrant is 13 cm (5.1 in) long. The sexes have the same plumage; males are slightly larger than females. Adults have a thin pale yellow supercilium, an indistinct pale yellow eye-ring, and a blackish line through the eye on an otherwise pale yellowish face. Their crown and upperparts are grayish olive. Their wings are dusky with wide white edges on the innermost flight feathers and the coverts; the last show as a large white patch on the closed wing. Their tail is long and dusky. The outer three pairs of feathers have large white ovals at their tips and the outermost have a wide yellowish white band at their base and white outer webs. Their throat and underparts are medium yellow with a slight olive to grayish olive tinge on the breast. Both sexes have a dark brown iris, a black bill, and black legs and feet.

== Distribution and habitat ==
The lesser wagtail-tyrant has a disjunct distribution. One population is found locally in the upper Orinoco Basin of far western Amazonas State of Venezuela and Guainía Department in eastern Colombia. Its main range is along major rivers in the Amazon Basin. These include the ríos Napo and Aguarico in Ecuador, the ríos Napo, Marañon, Ucayali and upper Amazon in Peru, the upper Amazon in Colombia along the Colombia-Peru border, and the upper and lower Amazon and ríos Juruá, Madeira, and Tapajós in Brazil. The lesser wagtail-tyrant primarily inhabits river islands but also the "mainland" along the river corridors. It especially favors early-successional areas thick with Tessaria, grass, and usually some young trees such as Salix and Cecropia. In elevation it seldom exceeds 300 m (1,000 ft) though it does reach 800 m (2,600 ft) in Colombia.

== Behavior ==
=== Movement ===
The lesser wagtail-tyrant is overall a year-round resident but makes local movements in response to changing water levels that alter the landscape.

=== Feeding ===
The lesser wagtail-tyrant's diet is not known in detail but is assumed to be mostly or entirely insects. It forages in pairs or family groups, actively moving through the vegetation with short pauses. It typically cocks its tail up and spreads the feathers which exposes the yellowish base and white tips; despite its name it does not wag its tail. It captures prey from leaves, twigs, and bark by gleaning while perched and with short sallies to hover-glean. It sometimes also drops to the ground to take prey.

=== Breeding ===
The lesser wagtail-tyrant's breeding season includes October in northern Brazil. Nothing else is known about its breeding biology, though it is assumed to be similar to that of its former subspecies the Bahia wagtail-tyrant. That species builds a cup nest of sticks held together with spider silk and lined with finer material. It is typically well hidden in foliage up to about 1.5 m (5 ft) above the ground. The clutch is two or three eggs. The incubation period, time to fledging, and details of parental care are not known.

=== Vocalization ===
The lesser wagtail-tyrant sings from a perch in small bushes and mainly in the early morning and late afternoon. The Amazon Basin population sings a "lively rollicking asynchronous duet, one bird uttering a descending rattle, the other uttering repeatedly a melodious note". The rattle has six to 12 notes, descends in pitch, and accelerates near the end, sounding like a bouncing ball. The melodious note is "a mellow chow or chowee", is sometimes doubled, and is sometimes given without the duet's rattle. The Orinoco Basin population's duet differs: "One pair-member issues an accelerating rattle, while the three melodious notes of the other bird are about equal in length, sounding like chew!...chee...chee (last note sometimes omitted)". The Amazonian population gives "a rich, whistled, overslurred heeu" call and the Orinoco population "a soft, whistled wheeert or more emphatic weeEE!".

== Status ==
The IUCN has assessed the lesser wagtail-tyrant as being of Least Concern. It has a large range; its population size is not known and is believed to be stable. No immediate threats have been identified. It is considered uncommon to locally fairly common overall though local in Colombia and Ecuador and known only since the late 1990s in Venezuela.
