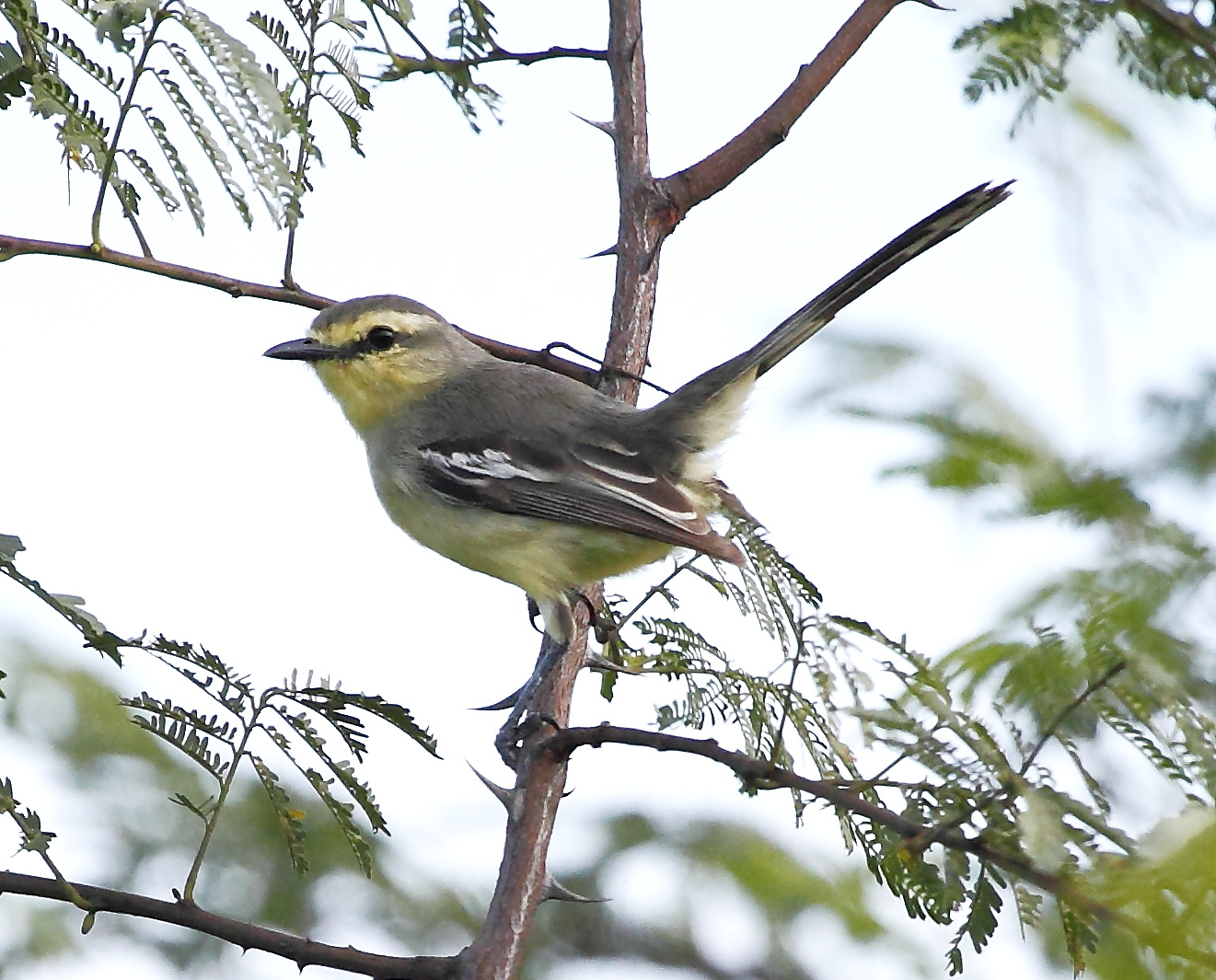

Conservation status
- Least Concern (IUCN 3.1)

Scientific classification
- Kingdom: Animalia
- Phylum: Chordata
- Class: Aves
- Order: Passeriformes
- Family: Tyrannidae
- Genus: Stigmatura
- Species: S. bahiae

Binomial name
- Stigmatura bahiae Chapman, 1926

= Bahia wagtail-tyrant =

Species of bird

The Bahia wagtail-tyrant (Stigmatura bahiae) is a species of bird in the family Tyrannidae, the tyrant flycatchers. It is endemic to eastern Brazil.

== Taxonomy and systematics ==
What is now the Bahia wagtail-tyrant was originally described as Stigmatura budytoides bahiae, a subspecies of the greater wagtail-tyrant. What is now the lesser wagtail-tyrant (S. napensis) was described as another subspecies at the same time. They were later treated as two subspecies of the lesser wagtail-tyrant. BirdLife International's Handbook of the Birds of the World separated them from each other as monotypic species in 2014. The Clements taxonomy did so in late 2022 and the International Ornithological Committee in early 2023. As of late 2024 the South American Classification Committee of the American Ornithological Society had not adopted the split.

== Description ==
The Bahia wagtail-tyrant is 13 cm (5.1 in) long. The sexes have the same plumage; males are slightly larger than females. Adults have a thin pale yellow supercilium and a dark line through the eye on an otherwise pale yellowish face. Their crown and upperparts are warm brownish. Their wings are dusky with wide white edges on the innermost flight feathers and the coverts; the last show as a large white patch on the closed wing. Their tail is long and dusky. The outer three pairs of feathers have large white ovals at their tips and the outermost have a wide yellowish white band at their base and white outer webs. Their throat and underparts are medium yellow with a slight olive to grayish olive tinge on the breast. Both sexes have a dark brown iris, a black bill, and black legs and feet.

== Distribution and habitat ==
The Bahia wagtail-tyrant is found in eastern Brazilian from Ceará south to Bahia. It inhabits semi-arid caatinga vegetation that typically is dense, brushy, and of low stature. It only rarely occurs in more open areas. In elevation it ranges from near sea level to about 500 m (1,600 ft).

== Behavior ==
=== Movement ===
The Bahia wagtail-tyrant is believed to be a year-round resident.

=== Feeding ===
The Bahia wagtail-tyrant's diet is not known in detail but is assumed to be mostly or entirely insects. Its foraging behavior is not well known but is described as similar to that of its former "parent" the lesser wagtail-tyrant. That species forages in pairs or family groups, actively moving through the vegetation with short pauses. It typically cocks its tail up and spreads the feathers which exposes the yellowish base and white tips; despite its name it does not wag its tail. It captures prey from leaves, twigs, and bark by gleaning while perched and with short sallies to hover-glean. The Bahia wagtail-tyrant is believed to drop to the ground to feed less often than the lesser.

=== Breeding ===
The Bahia wagtail-tyrant appears to have an extended breeding season from August to perhaps May or June. Its nest is a cup made from sticks held together with spider silk and lined with finer material. It is typically well hidden in foliage up to about 1.5 m (5 ft) above the ground. The clutch is two or three eggs that are whitish with dark brown and purplish markings. The incubation period, time to fledging, and details of parental care are not known.

=== Vocalization ===
The Bahia wagtail-tyrant sings from a perch in small bushes and mainly in the early morning and late afternoon. It sings "a lively rollicking asynchronous duet, one bird uttering a descending rattle, the other uttering repeatedly three melodious notes". The rattle has six to 10 descending notes at a fast pace. The melodeous part is "three different (but quite stereotypical) well-separated notes which sound like trree...tru...tuu (two notes burry and one pure and overslurred)" that is sometimes given without the duet's rattle.

== Status ==
The IUCN has assessed the Bahia wagtail-tyrant as being of Least Concern. It has a large range; its population size is not known and is believed to be stable. No immediate threats have been identified. It is considered "reasonably common in suitable habitat".
