= Virtual Valve Amplifier =

A Virtual Valve Amplifier (VVA) is software algorithm designed and sold by Diamond Cut Productions, Inc. for simulating the sound of various valve amplifier designs. It can be found within their DC8 and Forensics8 software programs.

A VVA can be used to color the sound of a digital recording by adding "tube-warmth" or "fat-bass" in addition to adding subtle harmonics to enhance very old or muffled recordings. The algorithms behind a VVA are based on real vacuum tube circuits and non-linearities, mathematically simulating the large-signal transfer functions of various vacuum tubes and output transformers found in amplifier designs. A majority of this data was originally derived from extensive bench measurements on real vacuum tube amplifier circuits under varying operating conditions by engineers Craig Maier and Rick Carlson in the early 1990s. A VVA is a direct mathematical reconstruction of the same signal passing through a physical electron tube amplifier. The VVA algorithm can be found in the Diamond Cut DC8 and DC Forensics8 software packages. It is also sold as a VST plug-in.

== Basic operating parameters ==
VVA designs generally include a number of parameters that may be configured to change the sound and operating characteristics of the amplifier design:

=== Operating point ===
Historically referred to as the "Q" or bias point by engineers, the operating point of a vacuum tube is a condition generally fixed by the amplifier manufacturer. In general, the operating point determines the device's bias value at zero signal input and determines the distribution of harmonics introduced into the output of the amplifier. Tubes that operate with a higher operating point close to cutoff give more "headroom", enabling greater volume gains to be applied before signal degradation in the form of "breakup" or saturation results. By contrast, a lower operating point introduces more harmonic distortion into the final output as a result of the different non-linearity distribution near cut-off as compared to operation in the nominally linear portion of the characteristic. Some guitar amplifiers are designed to produce this type of distortion as its sound effect is considered desirable.

=== Drive ===
This describes how loudly the "physical" equivalent of the virtual valve amplifier is set. However, the output level of a VVA generally remains constant independent of drive due to internal gain compensation algorithms. Instead, the drive determines the amount of distortion that can be introduced into the output signal. As such, the Drive of a VVA describes the degree of modulation applied to a given vacuum tube amplifier circuit centered about the set operating point. The higher the drive level setting, the greater will be the production of predominantly even order harmonics due to the circuit's asymmetrical non-linearity. As a result, the VVA "effect" increases with increasing drive.

== Common vacuum tube types ==
=== Triode 12AX7/ECC83 ===
This is a high-mu dual triode that is generally incorporated into an RC coupled class A audio pre-amplifier configuration and its design is optimized to minimize harmonic distortion. This vacuum tube is still the industry standard pre-amplifier valve. It has a relatively flat linear operating region in the middle of its dynamic operating range, producing relatively lower levels of distortion compared to some of the other devices listed here. But, by moving the Operating Point to either the saturation or cutoff extreme, more "tube-warmth" effect can be produced by this device. Some VST effects emulate this tube.

=== Triode 12AT7/ECC81 ===
The 12AT7 high-mu dual triode was designed primarily for RF mixing applications where it was incorporated into the oscillator/mixer stage and used to heterodyne incoming RF signals with the local oscillator to create an intermediate frequency in TV and FM sets. Thus, it is intentionally designed to be extremely non-linear. Thus, circuits based around the 12AT7 exhibit a larger degree of non-linearity throughout the entire dynamic operating range, including the middle. As a result, it produces greater even-order harmonic distortion (less objectionable than odd-order distortion).

=== Triode 12AU7/ECC82 ===
The 12AU7 is a medium-mu dual triode often found in the driver / phase inverter stage of a push–pull power amplifier and also results in significant non-linearity in the middle of its dynamic operating curve.

=== Pentode 6EJ7 ===
The 6EJ7 pentode and its equivalents are often found in high-gain vacuum tube microphone amplifiers which require the sharp cutoff of a pentode. It generally produces a very pleasant "tube-warmth" effect when the operating point is properly set. This device is the same as the European type EF184.

=== Pentode 6267/EF86 ===
The 6267 / EF86 pentode was a vacuum tube well suited for use in low-level pre-amplifiers where low noise and minimal microphonics were important. Its high-gain characteristics and family of operating curves make for useful harmonic distortion and signal compression properties.

== Common vacuum tube amplifier types ==
Circuits may be "single-ended", using a single output device (or several connected in parallel), or "push–pull", using paired devices configured to cancel out even-order distortion products and reduce output transformer magnetisation. Bias of a push–pull amplifier may be set to make both sides conduct at all times (amplifier class A), to make only one side conduct at a time (class B), or intermediate (class AB). Class A uses more power for the same output (i.e., is less efficient), can produce less output power from the same devices, and produces lower distortion, than classes AB and B.

=== 2-Stage Class A ===
These devices generally consisted of a 12AU7 medium-mu triode driving a single 6L6GC beam power pentode audio output valve or similar. Its effects are distinctive due to convolution of the non-linearity of the triode interacting with those of the pentode, with both devices operating in class-A mode. The 6L6GC is similar in performance to the industrial type 5881, and also the European type KT66.

=== 2-Stage Class AB ===
Often consisting of a 12AU7 phase inverter / driver, pushing a pair of 6L6GC beam power pentodes. The symmetrical push–pull circuit cancels out and reduces even-order distortion products compared with a single-ended circuit. The operating point is hard-wired and cannot be adjusted.

=== 2A3 push–pull ===
Also known as a "retro–triode" amplifier, it was invented in the 1930s and incorporated a directly heated cathode resulting in a high power output. It was often used in theatrical applications and public address systems. This vacuum amplifier typically exhibits a more linear output transfer characteristic than its pentode push-pull counterpart and as a result produces a characteristic clean sound. The particular devices used to create the 2A3 VVA models were of the "dual–plate" variety taken from unused stock manufactured for the military by RCA Victor in 1953. This configuration is favoured by many jazz musicians including Les Paul who reportedly used this amplifier configuration to cut all the records made from his home studio.

=== 2A3 single-ended ===
This is a single ended class A vacuum tube power amplifier implemented using the 2A3 power triode. It exhibits reasonably good linearity with dominant even distortion products.

=== Vacuum tube exciter ===
Because of the non-linear properties and distortion products of vacuum tubes and their associated amplification circuits, they are useful in the simulation of a vacuum tube rectifier (6X4) to produce harmonics. Asymmetry between the positive- and negative-going transfer function establishes the relationship between the degree of even and odd harmonics produced.

== See also ==
- Tube sound
