= Django Software Foundation =

Organization maintaining the Django web framework

- Founded: June 2008
- Type: 501(c)(3)
- Website: www.djangoproject.com/foundation/

The Django Software Foundation (DSF) is a 501(c)(3) non-profit organization that develops and maintains Django, a free and open source web application framework.

== Malcolm Tredinnick Memorial Prize ==
The DSF makes an annual award in honour of early Django contributor Malcolm Tredinnick, to the person who best exemplifies the spirit of Malcolm’s work - someone who welcomes, supports and nurtures newcomers; freely gives feedback and assistance to others, and helps to grow the community.

=== Past recipients ===
- 2013 Curtis Maloney
- 2014 Django Girls
- 2015 Russell Keith-Magee
- 2016 Aisha Bello
- 2017 Claude Paroz
- 2018 Kojo Idrissa
- 2019 Jeff Triplett
- 2020 Ken Whitesell
- 2021 Adam Johnson
- 2022 Paolo Melchiorre
- 2023 Djangonaut Space
- 2024 Rachell Calhoun
- 2025 Tim Schilling
