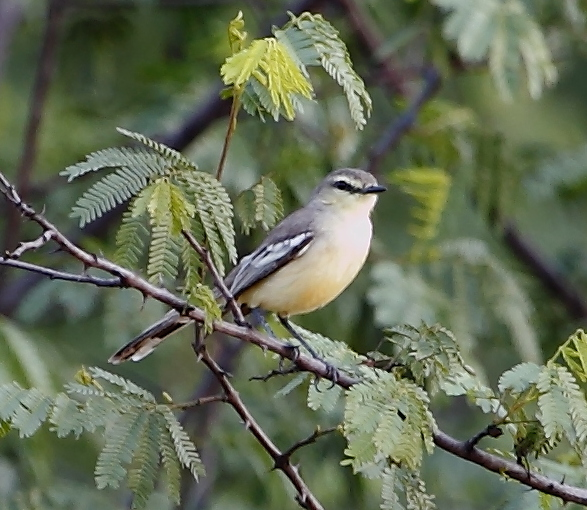

Conservation status
- Least Concern (IUCN 3.1)

Scientific classification
- Kingdom: Animalia
- Phylum: Chordata
- Class: Aves
- Order: Passeriformes
- Family: Tyrannidae
- Genus: Stigmatura
- Species: S. budytoides

Binomial name
- Stigmatura budytoides (D'Orbigny & Lafresnaye, 1837)

= Greater wagtail-tyrant =

Species of bird

The greater wagtail-tyrant (Stigmatura budytoides) is a species of bird in the family Tyrannidae, the tyrant flycatchers. It is found in Argentina, Bolivia, Brazil, and Paraguay.

== Taxonomy and systematics ==
The greater wagtail-tyrant was originally described as Culicivora budytoides. Later in the nineteenth century it moved to genus Stigmatura and over time gained six subspecies. Two of them have been separated as what are now the lesser wagtail-tyrant (S. napensis) and Bahia wagtail-tyrant (S. bahiae).

The remaining four subspecies are:

- S. b. budytoides (D'Orbigny & Lafresnaye, 1837)
- S. b. inzonata Wetmore & Peters, JL, 1923
- S. b. flavocinerea (Burmeister, 1861)
- S. b. gracilis Zimmer, JT, 1955

Subspecies S. b. gracilis differs from the other three in several characteristics and has a separate range, so some authors consider it a separate species.

== Description ==
The greater wagtail-tyrant is 14 to 16 cm (5.5 to 6.3 in) long and weighs 8.5 to 13.2 g (0.30 to 0.47 oz). The sexes have the same plumage; males are slightly larger than females. The nominate subspecies S. b. budytoides is the largest and S. b. gracilis is the smallest. Adults of the nominate subspecies have a bright yellow supercilium from the bill to past the eye, a blackish line through the eye, and dusky ear coverts on an otherwise yellowish face. Their crown and upperparts are grayish olive. Their wings are dusky with wide white edges on the innermost flight feathers and the coverts; the last show as a large white patch on the closed wing. Their tail is long and mostly dusky; the outer three or four pairs of feathers have large white ovals at their tips and the outermost have a wide white band at their base and white outer webs. Their throat and underparts are bright yellow with a slight buffy tinge on the breast.

Subspecies S. b. inzonata has paler yellow underparts than the nominate with almost no buffy wash on the breast. The white band on its outer tail feathers is variable but always smaller. S. b. flavocinerea has paler underparts than inzonata. It has grayish (less olive) upperparts than the nominate, with a more whitish supercilium, grayer edges on the wings, and smaller spots and no white base on the tail feathers. S. b. gracilis has plumage like the nominate's but is significantly smaller. Both sexes of all subspecies have a dark brown iris, a long black bill, and black legs and feet.

== Distribution and habitat ==
The greater wagtail-tyrant has a disjunct distribution. The subspecies are found thus:

- S. b. budytoides: Bolivia, in eastern Cochabamba, western Santa Cruz, and northern Chuquisaca departments
- S. b. inzonata: from southern Santa Cruz Department in Bolivia east and south into western Paraguay and northwestern Argentina as far south as Córdoba and San Luis provinces
- S. b. flavocinerea: central Argentina from Mendoza, Córdoba, and western Buenos Aires provinces south to northern Río Negro Province
- S. b. gracilis: eastern Brazilian states of Piauí, Ceará, Pernambuco, Bahia, and Minas Gerais

The first three subspecies inhabit the Gran Chaco, a biome characterized by arid scrublands, dry deciduous woodlands, and gallery forest in savanna. Subspecies S. b. gracilis inhabits similar but somewhat moister landscapes. In elevation the species occurs mostly between sea level and 1,000 m (3,300 ft) but reaches 2,700 m (8,900 ft) in Bolivia.

== Behavior ==
=== Movement ===
The greater wagtail-tyrant population in southern Argentina is believed to move north for the austral winter but the species' movements are not well understood.

=== Feeding ===
The greater wagtail-tyrant feeds on insects. It forages in pairs or family groups, mainly from near the ground to the tops of tall shrubs. It typically cocks its tail up and spreads the feathers which exposes the white tips; despite its name it does not wag its tail but sometimes pumps it. It captures prey from leaves, twigs, and bark by gleaning while perched and with short sallies to hover-glean. It sometimes also drops to the ground to take prey.

=== Breeding ===
The greater wagtail-tyrant breeds between October and December in Argentina; its breeding season elsewhwere is not known. Its nest is a cup made from plant fibers and rootlets held together with spider silk. It is placed 1 to 2 m (3 to 7 ft) above the ground a shrub, frequently a thorny one like Acacia. The clutch is two eggs. The incubation period is 14 to 15 days and fledging occurs about 12 days after hatch.

=== Vocalization ===
Greater wagtail pairs often sing in duet, a "high, liquid series of 'Wee-tjer- -' from one bird and 'tidrrr- -' from the other". The two vocalizations are also described as "whididideteh" and "tri-ti-treeowhit". The species also makes an "[a]brupt 'churt', sometimes in series, varied occasionally into more complex chatter".

== Status ==
The IUCN has assessed the greater wagtail-tyrant as being of Least Concern. It has a very large range; its population size is not known and is believed to be stable. No immediate threats have been identified. It is considered fairly common to common and S. b. gracilis appears to be expanding its range.
