= Django Girls =

International non-profit organization

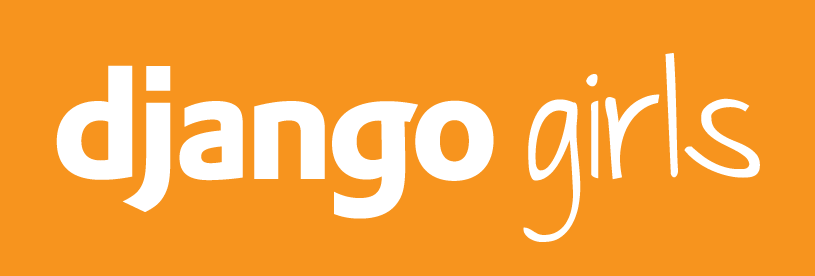
- Type: not-for-profit
- Key people: Ola Sitarska; Ola Sendecka
- Website: djangogirls.org

Django Girls is an international non-profit organization started by two Polish women, Ola Sitarska and Ola Sendecka, to inspire women from all backgrounds to get interested in technology and to become programmers, offering a safe and friendly environment. It is known for the free workshops it hosts to help women to learn to program and for its Django tutorial. It is often supported by the Python Software Foundation, and they often hold sessions at the Python Conference.

== History ==
The first Django Girls workshop, which kicked off Django Girls, happened during EuroPython 2014, in Berlin. Ola Sitarska and Ola Sendecka decided to use Django and Python because both are open source code platforms, which may help women developing their own ideas. Since then, the initiative has spread worldwide, reaching countries like Argentina, Australia, Bolivia, Brazil, Colombia, Ecuador, Ghana, Nigeria, United Kingdom, Peru, United States, Zimbabwe and many others.

== Tutorial ==
The tutorial, which teaches how to create and deploy a blog application using Django, is maintained and updated by the Django Girls community, using Github. As of May 2018, the Django Girls tutorial has been published online in 14 languages besides its original English version. As of May 2018, more than 1,000,000 users have visited its website.

== Django Girls workshops ==
Using a manual provided by the organization, Django Girls volunteers offer free one or two days workshops in many cities of the world, usually held during weekends. It is aimed at complete beginners, teaching about HTML, CSS, Python and Django. As of May 2018, 414 cities across 90 countries have hosted Django Girls workshops, with Accra, Athens, Florence, Kathmandu, Lagos, Lahore, Oxford, and São José dos Campos among them. As of May 2018, over 14,000 women have attended Django Girls workshops held across the globe.
