= Dynamical structure function =

Representation of linear dynamical systems

In control theory and systems theory, a dynamical structure function (DSF) is a representation of a linear time-invariant system that preserves the system's transfer function while also describing signal dependencies among a chosen set of measured, or manifest, variables. It is commonly used to represent the signal structure of a dynamic network: the directed dynamical dependencies among measured variables and the direct influence of external inputs on those variables.

The representation was introduced by Jorge Gonçalves and Sean Warnick in work on reconstructing LTI networks from input-output data and additional structural assumptions. A related formulation by Gonçalves and Warnick gave necessary and sufficient conditions for reconstructing an LTI network's dynamical structure from input-output data together with additional structural assumptions.

A DSF may be regarded as intermediate between a full state-space representation and an input-output transfer function. A transfer function records the behavior from external inputs to measured outputs but, by itself, does not generally determine the internal signal dependencies among measured variables. A state-space realization contains internal variables, but different realizations of the same transfer function may have different state coordinates and different apparent internal structures. A DSF fixes a set of manifest variables and describes how these variables dynamically influence one another after hidden variables have been algebraically or dynamically eliminated.

== Definition ==
Consider an LTI system with input $u$, measured output $y$, and transfer function $G(s)$, so that in the Laplace domain

$$Y(s)=G(s)U(s).$$

A dynamical structure function is usually written as a pair of transfer-function matrices $(Q(s),P(s))$ satisfying

$$Y(s)=Q(s)Y(s)+P(s)U(s),$$

where $Q(s)$ is square and hollow, meaning that all diagonal entries of $Q(s)$ are identically zero. The corresponding input-output transfer function is

$$G(s)=(I-Q(s))^{-1}P(s),$$

provided that the inverse is well defined.

The entries of $Q(s)$ describe dynamical dependencies among manifest variables. A nonzero entry $Q_{ij}(s)$ is interpreted as a directed dynamical influence from manifest signal $y_j$ to manifest signal $y_i$. The entries of $P(s)$ describe the direct dynamical influence of external inputs on manifest variables. The zero pattern of $Q(s)$ and $P(s)$ is often called the signal structure of the system.

The hollow condition on $Q(s)$ separates the self-dynamics of each manifest variable from the interconnection structure among distinct manifest variables. Self-dynamics are absorbed into the diagonal normalization used to define $Q(s)$ and $P(s)$ rather than being represented as self-loops in $Q(s)$.

== Derivation from a state-space model ==
A common derivation begins with a strictly proper LTI state-space model in which the state has been partitioned into manifest variables $y$ and hidden variables $z$:

$$\begin{bmatrix}
\dot y\\
\dot z
\end{bmatrix}
=
\begin{bmatrix}
A_{11} & A_{12}\\
A_{21} & A_{22}
\end{bmatrix}
\begin{bmatrix}
y\\
z
\end{bmatrix}
+
\begin{bmatrix}
B_1\\
B_2
\end{bmatrix}u.$$

Taking Laplace transforms and eliminating the hidden variable $Z(s)$ gives

$$sY(s)=W(s)Y(s)+V(s)U(s),$$

where

$$W(s)=A_{11}+A_{12}(sI-A_{22})^{-1}A_{21}$$

and

$$V(s)=B_1+A_{12}(sI-A_{22})^{-1}B_2.$$

Let $D_W(s)=\operatorname{diag}(W(s))$ be the diagonal matrix whose diagonal entries agree with those of $W(s)$. Rearranging the previous equation gives

$$Y(s)=
(sI-D_W(s))^{-1}(W(s)-D_W(s))Y(s)
+
(sI-D_W(s))^{-1}V(s)U(s).$$

Thus, for this partition, the DSF is

$$Q(s)=(sI-D_W(s))^{-1}(W(s)-D_W(s))$$

and

$P(s)=(sI-D_W(s))^{-1}V(s).$

This construction depends on the choice of manifest variables. A change of coordinates among hidden variables does not necessarily change the manifest signal structure, but a change of coordinates among manifest variables can change the DSF because the measured signals themselves have changed.

== Relation to transfer functions and state-space realizations ==
The DSF determines the transfer function through

$$G(s)=(I-Q(s))^{-1}P(s).$$

The converse is not true in general. A transfer function $G(s)$ alone does not uniquely determine $Q(s)$ and $P(s)$. For example, if $Q(s)$ is chosen so that $I-Q(s)$ is invertible, then $P(s)=(I-Q(s))G(s)$ produces the same input-output map. Additional assumptions about which variables are measured, which entries of $Q$ or $P$ are zero, or how inputs directly affect manifest variables are therefore needed for unique reconstruction.

The same input-output behavior may also be realized by many state-space models. DSFs were introduced partly to describe structural information that is not present in the transfer function but is less coordinate-dependent than a particular state-space realization.

== Network reconstruction and identifiability ==
One of the principal uses of DSFs is network reconstruction: estimating the directed signal structure among manifest variables from input-output data and prior structural information. Gonçalves and Warnick showed that even perfect knowledge of the transfer function is insufficient, in general, to reconstruct the Boolean structure of an LTI network without additional assumptions.

Starting from

$$G=(I-Q)^{-1}P,$$

one obtains

$$(I-Q)G=P$$

or equivalently

$$P+QG=G,$$

with the convention that the diagonal of $Q$ is zero. This identity gives linear equations in the unknown entries of $Q$ and $P$ once $G$ is known. Structural assumptions, such as known zero entries in $Q$ or $P$, can reduce the degrees of freedom and may make the DSF identifiable.

A common sufficient condition is input specificity, in which each external input directly affects only one manifest variable. This condition makes $P$ diagonal, or otherwise imposes a known sparsity pattern on $P$, and can make reconstruction of $Q$ possible under suitable rank conditions.

Extensions of the reconstruction problem have considered robustness to uncertainty, incomplete information, and network reconstruction in biological systems. Yuan, Stan, Warnick, and Gonçalves studied robust dynamical network structure reconstruction and related the DSF framework to the reconstruction of biochemical and genetic networks.

== Realization and abstraction theory ==
A DSF can be realized by state-space models, but the minimal state dimension needed to realize a DSF may differ from the minimal dimension needed to realize only its transfer function. This is because a DSF encodes both input-output behavior and additional signal-structure constraints. Yuan, Rai, Yeung, Stan, Warnick, and Gonçalves studied minimal realization problems for classes of DSFs and showed that preserving signal structure can impose additional realization requirements.

Later work placed DSFs within a broader theory of dynamic network representations, abstractions, and realizations. In this setting, different representations may preserve the same input-output behavior while exposing different amounts of structural detail. Well-posedness conditions are needed to ensure that these dynamic network representations define valid systems.

== Applications ==
=== Biological network reconstruction ===
DSFs have been used as a modeling tool for reconstructing biological and biochemical networks from dynamical data. In such settings, measured variables may represent concentrations or activities of biological species, while hidden variables represent unmeasured reactions, intermediates, or regulatory processes. The DSF formalism is useful because it separates input-output behavior from the inferred signal structure among measured variables, particularly by taking advantage of chemical specificity to satisfy the required constraints needed for exact reconstruction.

=== Cyber-physical system vulnerability ===
DSF-based signal structures have also been used in vulnerability analysis for cyber-physical systems. In this context, the entries of $Q$ and related internal signal maps can represent communication or information-flow links that may be perturbed by an attacker. Chetty, Woodbury, Vaziripour, and Warnick formulated vulnerability to distributed and coordinated destabilization attacks as a robustness problem for LTI systems.

Related work has studied vulnerable links and secure architectures in networks of controlled dynamical systems. A link is considered vulnerable when a perturbation to the corresponding signal transfer can destabilize the interconnected system.

== Related representations ==
Several representations can be used to describe structure in interconnected dynamical systems. A state-space model represents a system using internal state variables; a transfer function represents input-output behavior; a subsystem structure represents interconnections among subsystems; and a DSF represents signal dependencies among manifest variables. These representations are related but do not generally determine one another uniquely.

== See also ==
- System identification
- Networked control system
- Robust control
