= Nano differential scanning fluorimetry =

Biochemistry method

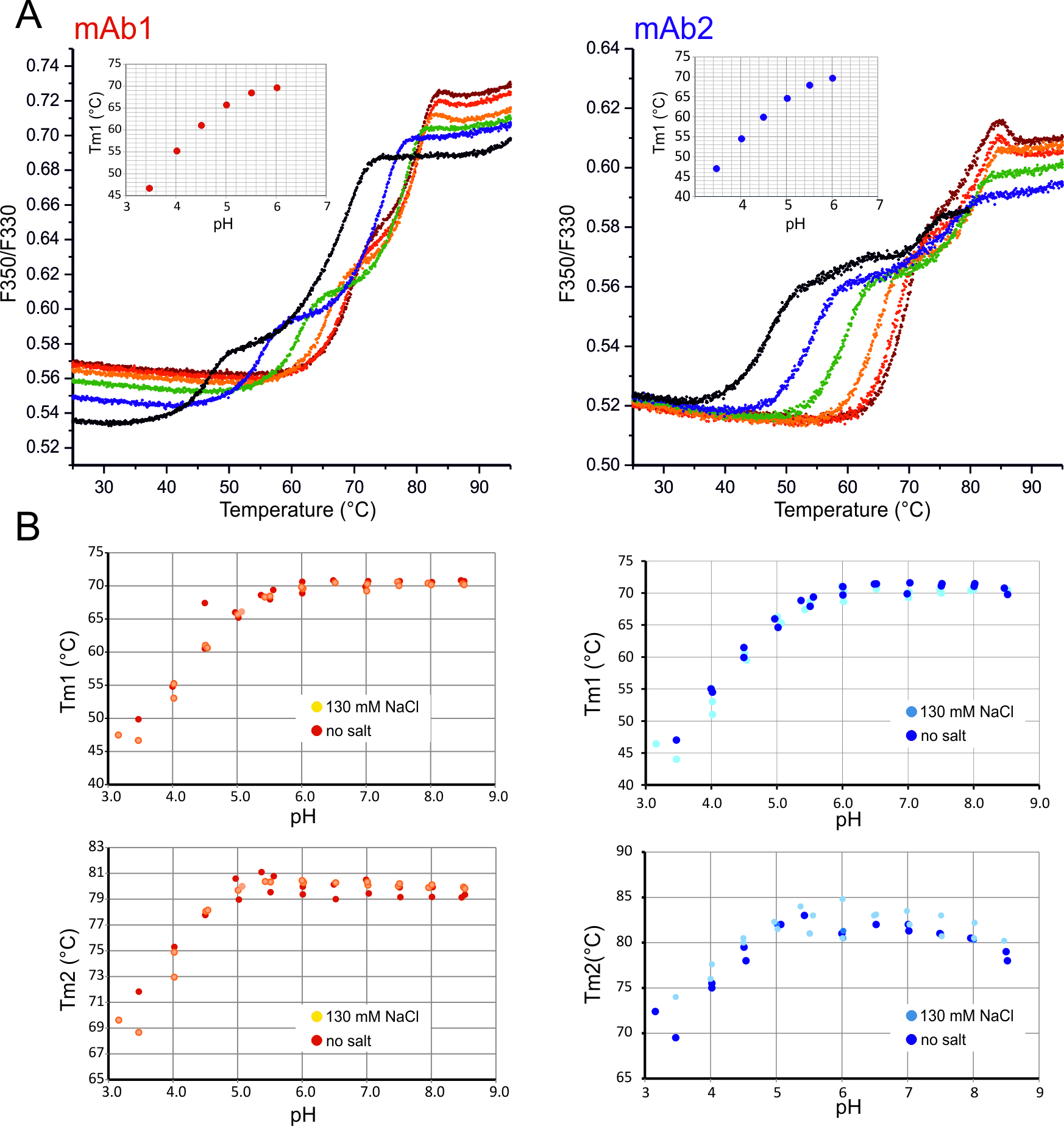
Thermal unfolding curves and unfolding transition midpoints of two monoclonal antibodies. (A) Thermal unfolding curves of two monoclonal antibodies in the presence of 25 mM Na-Citrate at different pH values. Insets show the pH-dependence of the first unfolding midpoint (Tm1). (B) Dependence of Tm1 and Tm2 on the pH of the buffer of all tested conditions.

NanoDSF is a type of differential scanning fluorimetry (DSF) method used to determine conformational protein stability by employing intrinsic tryptophan or tyrosine fluorescence, as opposed to the use of extrinsic fluorogenic dyes that are typically monitored via a qPCR instrument. A nanoDSF assay is also known as a type of Thermal Shift Assay.

Protein stability is typically addressed by thermal or chemical unfolding experiments. In thermal unfolding experiments, a linear temperature ramp is applied to unfold proteins, whereas chemical unfolding experiments use chemical denaturants in increasing concentrations. The thermal stability of a protein is typically described by the 'melting temperature' or 'Tm', at which 50% of the protein population is unfolded, corresponding to the midpoint of the transition from folded to unfolded.

In contrast to conventional DSF methods, nanoDSF uses tryptophan or tyrosine fluorescence to monitor protein unfolding. Both the fluorescence intensity and the fluorescence maximum strongly depend on the close chemical environment of the tryptophan. Typically, interior tryptophan residues in a more hydrophobic environment exhibit a notable emission red shift from approximately 330 nm to 350 nm upon protein unfolding and exposure to water. Quantification of these fluorescence wavelength shifts at various temperature intervals yields a measurement of T_{m}. Accepted methods to detect and quantify the fluorescence wavelength shift include measuring the intensity at a single wavelength, computing a ratio of the intensity at two wavelengths (typically 330 nm and 350 nm), or calculating the barycentric mean (BCM) by measuring the center of mass of the fluorescence waveform. The latter BCM method takes advantage of the entire UV-fluorescence spectrum, thus allowing for flexibility when auto-fluorescent small molecules are present.

Applications of nanoDSF include protein or antibody engineering, membrane protein research, quality control and formulation development, and ligand binding. NanoDSF has also been utilized to rapidly evaluate the melting points of enzyme libraries for biotechnological applications.

Currently there are at least four instruments on the market that can measure fluorescence wavelength shifts in a high-throughput manner while heating the samples through a defined temperature ramp. These instruments employ either proprietary quartz capillaries, cartridges, or plates or generic high-throughput 384-well plastic plates for sample analysis.

== Applications ==
The nanoDSF technology was used to confirm on-target binding of BI-3231 to HSD17B13 and to elucidate its uncompetitive mode of inhibition with regards to NAD^{+}.

NanoDSF was used to compare the thermal stability of a matched set of anti-CD20 antibodies representing a range of variants. The results revealed a spectrum of activities.

NanoDSF has also been applied in drug repurposing and anticancer research. In a large-scale screen of FDA-approved molecules, the method was used to identify several dozen novel microtubule-targeting agents (MTAs), including clinically used drugs such as aprepitant, disulfiram, and toremifene, by directly demonstrating their interaction with tubulin and their effects on microtubule polymerization.
