= The Society of Floristry Limited =

The Society of Floristry Limited was formed in 1951 to meet the growing need for professional recognition for florists in the UK. Its first major task, after forming a Council of directors composed of leading florists in the industry, was to write, run and mark examinations in floristry skills and theory, which it did successfully for almost 49 years. It developed into an educational and standard-setting body which pioneered the concept of floristry as a profession, running regular workshops and educational seminars for florists undertaking study and continuing professional development. It went out of existence in 2010.

== History ==
The cornerstone of the success of the Society was the ability of training providers to draw down Government funding for courses which supported what became the gold standard qualifications in the UK for florists, the Intermediate Certificate of the Society of Floristry (ICSF) and the National Diploma of the Society of Floristry (NDSF). When the ability to draw this funding was removed a few years ago in an initiative to reduce the number of organisations awarding recognised qualifications, the number of florists able to afford to attend colleges and the ability of those colleges to offer courses toward the examinations was severely restricted. As a consequence, the number coming forward to be examined dropped off significantly, and the pass rate amongst those who did fell also. The Society did not want to see a situation develop where its standards were eroded, and entered into negotiations with NPTC City and Guilds to write recognised qualifications at Higher Education level to replace the well-recognised and valued ICSF and NDSF. The courses came into existence during 2006. This had a number of advantages for candidates: Colleges were funded so courses were available and more affordable; college support for learning needs could be accessed; the standards and skills required became more transparent and accessible. However, the result for the Society was that its reason for existing was seriously eroded.

On 28 February 2010 the Society ceased trading and was acquired and absorbed into the British Florist Association.

== Trade show ==
The Society also ran a highly successful trade show for many years, enabling the best exponents of the craft to showcase their skills and talents, and for the support industries in the trade to launch and promote their product. These shows were attended by thousands of florists and students over the years, raising standards and pushing back the boundaries of commercial floral design.
