= HMS Wagtail =

HMS Wagtail is the name of one ship and one shore establishment of the Royal Navy:

- HMS Wagtail (1806), a Cuckoo-class schooner
- HMS Wagtail (shore establishment), originally RAF Heathfield, commissioned as a Royal Navy Air Station from 1944 to 1946
