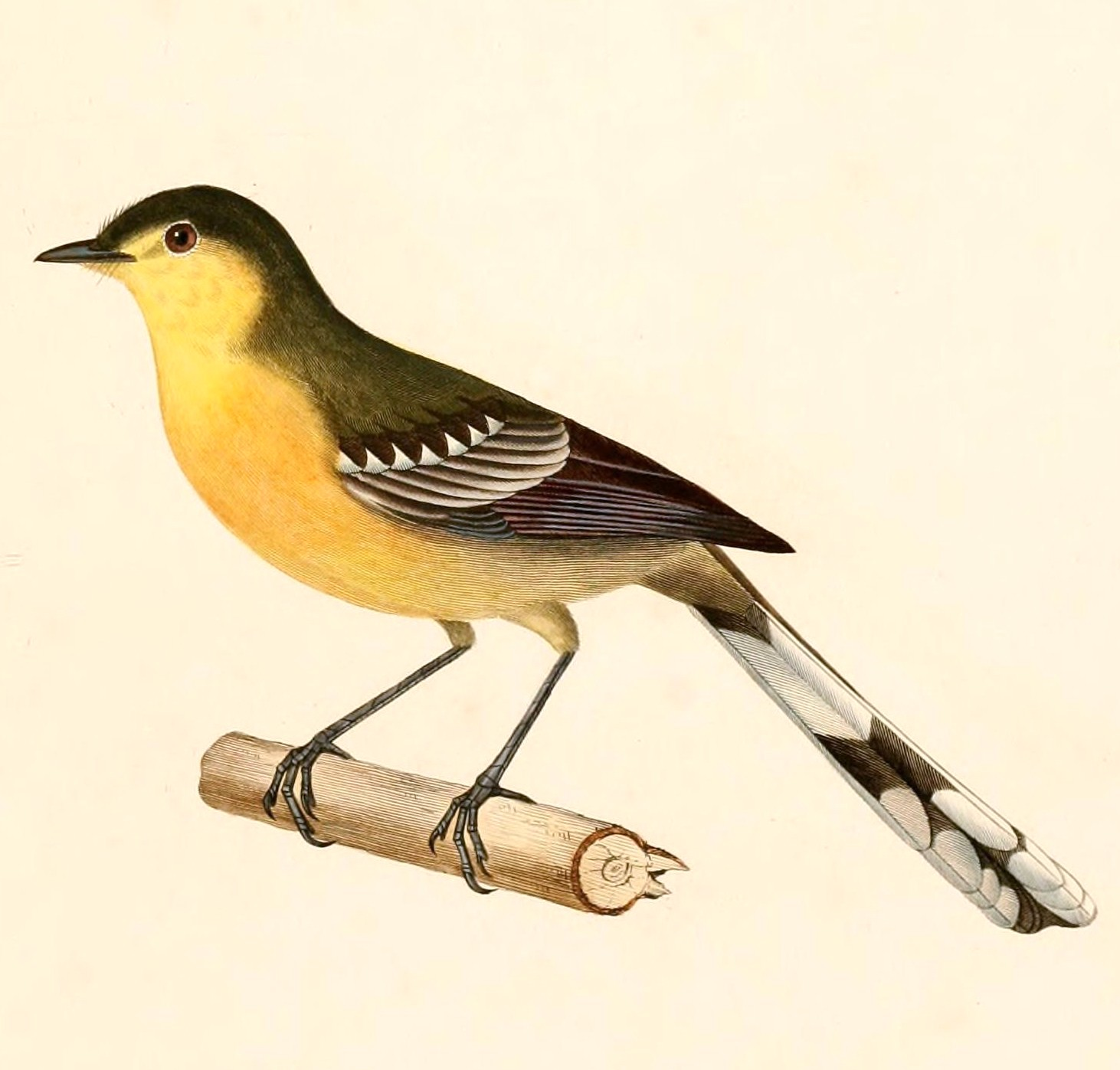
- Greater wagtail-tyrant (Stigmatura budytoides)

Scientific classification
- Kingdom: Animalia
- Phylum: Chordata
- Class: Aves
- Order: Passeriformes
- Family: Tyrannidae
- Genus: Stigmatura; Sclater, PL & Salvin, 1866

Type species
- Culicivora budytoides d'Orbigny & Lafresnaye, 1837

Species
- 2-4 described species, see text

= Wagtail-tyrant =

Genus of birds

The wagtail-tyrants are a genus, Stigmatura, of small South American birds in the family Tyrannidae. They are yellow below and have long black-and-white tails that are frequently cocked.

== Species ==
The three described species are sometimes further split into two species each (i.e., resulting in a total of four species). Additionally, a possibly undescribed species is found in the Orinoco Basin in Venezuela.

- Lesser wagtail-tyrant (Stigmatura napensis)
- Bahia wagtail-tyrant (Stigmatura bahiae)
- Greater wagtail-tyrant (Stigmatura budytoides)
  - Caatinga wagtail-tyrant (Stigmatura budytoides gracilis)
