= Wagtail (software) =

Website content management system

Wagtail (CMS)
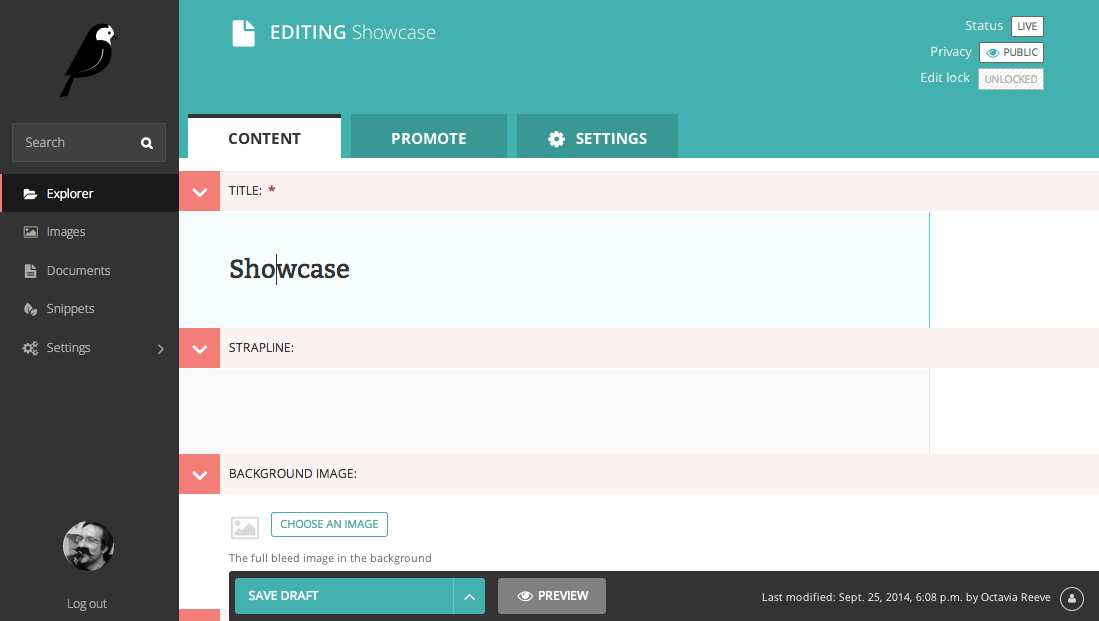
- Wagtail interface
- Developer: Torchbox
- Initial release: February 2014; 11 years ago
- Written in: Python
- Operating system: Cross-platform
- Platform: Django
- Available in: 50 languages
- Type: Content management system
- License: 3-clause BSD
- Website: wagtail.org

Wagtail is a free and open source content management system (CMS) written in Python. It is popular amongst websites using the Django web framework. The project is maintained by a team of open-source contributors backed by companies around the world. The project has a focus on developer friendliness as well as ease of use of its administration interface, translated in multiple languages.

== History ==
The Wagtail project was started in 2014 by Torchbox, a digital agency. The development of the CMS evolved from being the sole action of its creators to receiving contributions from 46 external contributors by its version 1.0 in July 2015. Since then, development sprints have been organised to foster the community. During those sprints, contributors gather to work on selected topics and steer the project. As of July 2016, 257 people had directly contributed to the code and translations. In January 2017, the core development team had increased to nine developers and the main GitHub repository was moved from the Torchbox namespace to a dedicated Wagtail namespace.

== Notable uses ==
- NASA for the Jet Propulsion Laboratory website
- Google blog
- The 18F agency of the US Government for beta.FEC.gov
- Peace Corps on their site
- New Zealand Red Cross on their site
- University of Pennsylvania for the Wharton Tech Blog
- University of Duhok for their site
- California Institute of Technology for their site
- University of Tasmania for multiple sites
- Consumer Financial Protection Bureau for their site
- The UK's National Health Service migrated their main site to Wagtail, beginning in 2017.
- Nebraska Public Media — the state's PBS and NPR stations — use it for their site.
