= Distortion synthesis =

Set of electronic sound synthesis techniques

Distortion synthesis is a group of sound synthesis techniques which modify existing sounds to produce more complex sounds (or timbres), usually by using non-linear circuits or mathematics.

While some synthesis methods achieve sonic complexity by using many oscillators, distortion methods create a frequency spectrum which has many more components than oscillators.

Some distortion techniques are: FM synthesis, waveshaping synthesis, and discrete summation formulas.

== FM synthesis ==
Frequency modulation synthesis distorts the carrier frequency of an oscillator by modulating it with another signal. The distortion can be controlled by means of a modulation index.

The method known as phase distortion synthesis is similar to FM.

== Waveshaping synthesis ==
Waveshaping synthesis changes an original waveform by responding to its amplitude in a non-linear fashion. It can generate a bandwidth-limited spectrum, and can be continuously controlled with an index.

== Discrete summation formulas ==
DSF synthesis refers to algorithmic synthesis methods which use mathematical formulas to sum, or add together, many numbers to achieve a desired wave shape. This powerful method allows, for example, synthesizing a 3-formant voice in a manner similar to FM voice synthesis. DSF allows the synthesis of harmonic and inharmonic, band-limited or unlimited spectra, and can be controlled by an index. As Roads points out, by reducing digital synthesis of complex spectra to a few parameters, DSF can be much more economical.

== Notable users ==
Jean-Claude Risset was one notable pioneer in the adoption of distortion methods.
