= List of Ajax frameworks =

This is a list of notable Ajax frameworks, used for creating web applications with a dynamic link between the client and the server. Some of the frameworks are JavaScript compilers, for generating JavaScript and Ajax that runs in the web browser client; some are pure JavaScript libraries; others are server-side frameworks that typically rely on JavaScript libraries.

== JavaScript ==
JavaScript frameworks are browser-side frameworks very commonly used in Ajax development. There are hundreds of JavaScript frameworks available. According to latest surveys, the most used JavaScript frameworks are:

Framework	License
jQuery, a JavaScript library that provides an Ajax framework and other utilities, and jQuery UI, a plug-in that provides abstractions for low-level interaction and animation, advanced effects and high-level, themeable widgets.	GPL and MIT
MooTools, a compact and modular JavaScript framework best known for its visual effects and transitions.	
Prototype, a JavaScript framework that provides Ajax and other utilities, and Script.aculo.us, a plug-in for animations and interface development.	MIT
YUI Library, a set of utilities and controls, for building richly interactive web applications using techniques such as DOM scripting, DHTML and Ajax.	BSD
ASP.NET AJAX, a set of extensions to ASP.NET for implementing Ajax functionality.	Microsoft Public License
Spry framework, an open source Ajax framework developed by Adobe which is used in the construction of Rich Internet applications. It is no longer maintained.	MIT
Dojo Toolkit, an Open Source DHTML toolkit written in JavaScript.	modified BSD license or the Academic Free License
Ext JS, a library that extends Prototype, Jquery and YUI until version 1.0. Since version 1.1 a standalone Ajax framework.	Proprietary/freeware; older 2008 version GPLv3
Backbone.js, loosely based on the Model–View–Controller application design paradigm	MIT
AngularJS	MIT

Other notable frameworks that are more AJAX specific, and not among the list of general purpose frameworks:

- AJAX.OOP, an open source framework, it provides an OOP-style programming engine and Ajax requests-handling functionality to create web 2.0 components.
- Bindows, an enterprise Ajax framework, with Windows look and feel
- qooxdoo, is a comprehensive Ajax application framework. Leveraging object-oriented JavaScript allows developers to build cross-browser applications.
- SproutCore, designed to make desktop-like apps for the web
- Wakanda Framework, works on top of WakandaDB with server-side JS implementations, designed to build interfaces for desktop & mobile Web applications.
- Webix, an JavaScript framework for developing unique user interfaces with DataTable, SpreadSheet, Pivot, Kanban, File Manager, Scheduler widgets.

== Java ==
These frameworks use Java for server-side Ajax operations:

- Apache Wicket an open-source Java server-centric framework supporting Ajax development
- AribaWeb an open-source framework with reflection and object-relational mapping
- DWR Direct Web Remoting
- Echo for Ajax servlets
- Google Web Toolkit a widget library with a Java to JavaScript compiler
- JackBe enterprise Ajax framework
- JSF Java Server Faces
- RAP Eclipse Rich Ajax Platform
- JBoss RichFaces, ICEfaces and PrimeFaces open-source Ajax component libraries for JavaServer Faces
- Vaadin a server-side Java widget framework depending on GWT
- ZK an open-source Java server+client fusion Ajax framework depending on jQuery and XUL

== .NET ==
The following frameworks are available for the Windows .NET platform:

- ASP.NET AJAX (previously Microsoft Atlas)

== Perl ==
- Catalyst, Catalyst::Plugin::Prototype or other js frameworks

== PHP ==
A PHP Ajax framework is able to deal with database, search data, and build pages or parts of page and publish the page or return data to the XMLHttpRequest object.

- Quicknet is an Ajax framework that provides secure data transmission, uses PHP on the server side
- Sajax PHP framework with a lot of functions, easy to integrate functions yourself

== Ruby ==
The Ruby on Rails framework used to implement a Domain-specific language named RJS, which can be used to write Ruby code that generates Javascript code. The code generated by RJS was usually loaded using Ajax, e.g. by using Ajax-enabled helper methods Ruby on Rails provides, such as the link_to_remote helper. It was replaced by jQuery as of Rails 3.1

Many of the Ruby on Rails Ajax-enabled helper methods used to work by using Prototype to perform an Ajax request in older versions of Rails. In most cases Javascript code is returned by the server to be executed by the browser, unlike the usual case where Ajax is used to retrieve data in XML or JSON format.

== See also ==
- Ajax framework
- Web service
- Ajax
