= OmniFaces =

Original author(s)	Bauke Scholtz / Arjan Tijms
Stable release	3.7.1; July 12, 2020
Written in	JSF API, Java
Operating system	Cross-platform
Type	JSF, Ajax, Java
License	Apache License 2.0
Website	http://omnifaces.org/

OmniFaces is an open source utility library for the JavaServer Faces 2 framework. It was developed using the JSF API, and its aim is to make JSF life easier by providing a set of artifacts meant to improve the functionality of the JSF framework. Omnifaces was created in response to seeing the same questions and the same example and utility code posted over and over again. It simply comes as an answer to day-by-day problems encountered during working with JSF (e.g. bug fixing, pitfalls, missing features, missing utilities, common questions, etc.). Many of these problems were collected from StackOverflow.

OmniFaces was developed by two members of the JSF Expert Group (JSF EG), Bauke Scholtz (aka BalusC) and Arjan Tijms.

OmniFaces can be used in both JSF implementations, Mojarra and Apache MyFaces, and is intended to work in cooperation with existing JSF libraries, like PrimeFaces, OpenFaces, ICEfaces, MyFaces Trinidad, etc.

== History ==
The OmniFaces project started on 1 March 2012. The latest release is OmniFaces 3.0 (released on 3 January 2018).

=== Release history ===
Release	Release Date	Highlights
OmniFaces 1.0	June 1, 2012	highlighting fields that failed validation; automatically setting label of associated input component; include Servlets and JSP pages in Facelets; Ajax aware exception handler; extensionless URLs; passing a method expression into Facelets tag, multi-field validators
OmniFaces 1.1	July 10, 2012	form with support to include view parameters in action URL; HTML5 render kit; new Messages builder; new validator which validates if ALL of the given inputs have been filled out
OmniFaces 1.2	October 20, 2012	support for programmatically executing callback scripts in Ajax response; fix for dealing with ViewExpiredException; buffers the Ajax response fully until buffer size
OmniFaces 1.3	December 20, 2012	new Ajax#updateRow() and Ajax#updateColumn(); new <o:enableRestorableView>; new <o:validateBean>; new SelectItemsIndexConverter; new <o:commandScript>
OmniFaces 1.4	March 11, 2013	new for attribute in <o:validator> so that it can target inputs in composites; UnmappedResourceHandler which removes the JSF prefix/suffix mapping from resource paths; <o:importFunctions> taghandler to import public static non-void methods of a given type as EL functions; <o:param> which extends <f:param> with support for a Converter
OmniFaces 1.5	June 10, 2013	added new includeRequestParams attribute to <o:form>; <o:messages> which extends <h:messages> with support for multiple client IDs in for attribute; ability to disable HTML escaping and ability to perform markupless rendering like <ui:repeat>; message interpolator for Bean Validation that allows a component's label to be inserted in the middle of a message; added converters for an Iterable to List and DataModel; new protected methods FullAjaxExceptionHandler#findExceptionRootCause() and #findErrorPageLocation() so that it can easier be subclassed
OmniFaces 1.6	September 19, 2013	OmniFaces depends on CDI from this version on; injecting, converting and validating HTTP request parameters via CDI @Param; transparent support for dependency injection (CDI and EJB) inside @FacesConverter and @FacesValidator; new JNDI utility class; CDI compatible @ViewScoped annotation specifically for JSF 2.0/2.1; useRequestURI attribute for <o:form> to submit to exactly the same URL as in browser's address bar (with query string)
OmniFaces 1.7	January 13, 2014	new ValueChangeValidator; new CacheControlFilter which can control cache-related headers of the response; added SortedTreeModel which holds the <o:tree> children in a TreeSet
OmniFaces 1.8.1	June 2, 2014	added <o:deferredScript> which is capable of deferring JavaScript resources to window.onload; <o:massAttribute> which sets the given attribute on all nested components; FacesMessageExceptionHandler which sets any caught exception as a global FATAL faces message; <o:cache> has new disabled attribute to temporarily disable the cache and pass-through children directly; <o:viewParam> skips converter for null model values so that query string doesn't get polluted with an empty string
OmniFaces 2.0	November 24, 2014	NoAutoGeneratedIdViewHandler which throws a runtime exception when an autogenerated JSF client ID is being rendered; <o:viewParamValidationFailed> which enables sending either a redirect or error status on validation failure of view parameters; <o:graphicImage> which is capable of referencing a byte[] or InputStream property with optional support for data URI format; <o:moveComponent> via which components, facets and behaviors can be moved at runtime to a target component in various ways; <o:resolveComponent> via which a component can be looked up by its ID and a reference to it put in various scopes; <o:validateBean> now supports validating beans at the class level
OmniFaces 2.1	June 3, 2015	<o:tagAttribute> to explicitly declare a tagfile attribute which is only exposed in tagfile's own EL scope, to prevent pollution in EL scope of nested tagfiles; FacesConfigXml to get faces-config.xml entries which are not available via native JSF API (currently only a mapping of all <resource-bundle> entries can be obtained); <o:graphicImage> now also supports SVG images with explicit type="svg" attribute and fragment attribute for SVG view modes; @Cookie to inject a HTTP request cookie in a CDI managed bean; CombinedResourceHandler now supports server-side caching of combined resources via org.omnifaces.COMBINED_RESOURCE_HANDLER_CACHE_TTL context param; @Eager now also supports JSF 2.2 javax.faces.view.ViewScoped
OmniFaces 2.2	November 24, 2015	Second life for @ViewScoped; FileServlet - New FileServlet with advanced HTTP range and caching support; <o:viewAction> - Fix unintuitive "if" attribute of <f:viewAction>
OmniFaces 2.3	April 1, 2016	@ViewScoped - Improved; <o:socket> - For web socket based push which can be accessed via CDI @Push; <o:skipValidators> - To skip all validation during a UICommand action or an ajax request; FileServlet - Supports customizing 404 error handling and attachment file name; Beans#fireEvent() - To fire a CDI event object; More utilities - Beans#isActive(scope) | of:formatThousands() | of:formatThousandsUnit() | of:formatNumberDefaultForLocale() | Faces#getViewName() | Ajax#load() | Servlets#getRemoteAddr()
OmniFaces 2.4	July 1, 2016	Components#getCurrentActionSource/ActionExpressionsAndListeners() - Which should ease a.o. logging JSF ajax actions; <o:url> - Which fills the gap caused by absence of JSTL <c:url> in Facelets; FullAjaxExceptionHandler - Got new logException override which allows determining the log reason; of:reverseArray() - To reverse an array
OmniFaces 3.0	January 3, 2018	Dependencies are changed to Java 1.8, JSF 2.3, EL 3.0, Servlet 3.1, CDI 2.0 and BV 2.0; Removed RichFaces compatibility since End of Life was declared for RichFaces in June 2016; OmniFaces initialization will explicitly fail if CDI BeanManager is unavailable during application startup; <o:form> now defaults to useRequestURI="true"; <o:form> now defaults to partialSubmit="true"; <o:validateBean showMessageFor="@violating"> will not anymore show "remaining" messages for properties which are not covered by JSF form; ValidateMultipleFields will no longer skip readonly/disabled/unrendered components but instead supply their current model value; org.omnifaces.component.output.cache package has been moved to org.omnifaces.util.cache; Faces/FacesLocal and Servlets utility methods will now throw UncheckedIOException instead of IOException; All in 2.x @Deprecated things have been removed and replaced by JSF 2.2 native passthrough attributes; and other

== See also ==
Other JSF libraries:

- PrimeFaces
- RichFaces
- ICEfaces
- OpenFaces
- Apache MyFaces
- * Tobago
- * Tomahawk
- ADF Faces
- PrettyFaces
