= List of rich web application frameworks =

For a list of mobile only frameworks see Multiple phone web based application framework.

Below is a list of rich web application frameworks:

Framework	Software license	Windows	macOS	Linux	Built formats
Angular	MIT	Yes	Yes	Yes	JavaScript
Apache Cordova, formerly PhoneGap	Free	Yes	Yes	Yes	iOS, Android, BlackBerry OS, WebOS, Windows Phone 7, Symbian, Bada
Apache Flex, formerly Adobe Flex	Apache 2	Yes	Yes	Yes	Adobe AIR, SWF
Appcelerator Titanium	Proprietary	Yes	Yes	Yes	Java server, JavaScript client
Blend4Web	Mixed: GPL v3 or commercial	Yes	Yes	Yes	JavaScript
Curl	Proprietary	Yes	Yes	Yes	Curl
Django	BSD	Yes	Yes	Yes	Python server, HTML/JavaScript client
Dojo	BSD modified	Yes	Yes	Yes	JavaScript
Echo3	MPL, GPL, LGPL	Yes	Yes	Yes	Java server, JavaScript client
Eclipse Scout	EPL	Yes	Yes	Yes	Java server, JavaScript client
Ember.js	MIT	Yes	Yes	Yes	JavaScript
expanz	Proprietary	Yes	Yes	Yes	Adobe Air, Flash, Java FX, Microsoft Silverlight, Windows Mobile, WPF
ExtJS	Mixed: GPL v3 or commercial	Yes	Yes	Yes	JavaScript
Flask	BSD	Yes	Yes	Yes	Python server, HTML/JavaScript client
Framework7	MIT	Yes	Yes	Yes	iOS, Android, JavaScript client (Desktop Web browser)
Google Web Toolkit	Apache 2	Yes	Yes	Yes	Java server, JavaScript client
JavaFX	Free	Yes	Yes	Yes	jar, applet
JavaScriptMVC	Free	Yes	Yes	Yes	JavaScript, compressed and one file
JVx	Apache 2	Yes	Yes	Yes	Java, Vaadin, iOS, Android; UI independent architecture
Lively Kernel	MIT	Yes	Yes	Yes	JavaScript
LiveCode	Free	Yes	Yes	Yes	Android, iPhone, Windows Mobile
Meteor	MIT	Yes	Yes	Yes	JavaScript
.NET Framework	Proprietary	Yes	Yes	Yes	Microsoft Silverlight
OpenLaszlo	Free	Yes	Yes	Yes	DHTML, SWF
OpenSilver	MIT	Yes	Yes	Yes	WebAssembly (XAML + .NET)
OpenUI5	Apache 2	Yes	Yes	Yes	JavaScript
Panda3D	Free	Yes	Yes	Yes	P3D
qooxdoo	LGPL, EPL	Yes	Yes	Yes	JavaScript
Qt Quick	Mixed: GPL, LGPL, commercial	Yes	Yes	Yes	QML
Remote Application Platform, formerly Rich Ajax Platform	Free	Yes	Yes	Yes	Java
Rhomobile	Free	Yes	Yes	Yes	Android, BlackBerry OS, iOS, Symbian, Windows Mobile
Ruby on Rails	MIT	Yes	Yes	Yes	Ruby server, HTML/JavaScript client
Sproutcore	MIT	Yes	Yes	Yes	JavaScript
Unity	Proprietary	Yes	Yes	Yes	Unity Web Player, iOS, Android, Windows, macOS, Wii; planned: Flash (SWF), PlayStation, Xbox
Vaadin	Mixed: Apache 2 or commercial	Yes	Yes	Yes	Java server, JavaScript client
VIEwoNLY	Proprietary	Yes	Yes	Yes	PHP
Vue	MIT	Yes	Yes	Yes	JavaScript
Wakanda	Mixed: Community (AGPL) or commercial	Yes	Yes	Yes	JavaScript client and server
Webix	Mixed: GPL v3 or commercial	Yes	Yes	Yes	JavaScript
Wt	Mixed: GPL, commercial	Yes	Yes	Yes	C++ or Java server ↔ HTML; uses JavaScript if available
Xojo	Proprietary	Yes	Yes	Yes	Xojo Server, JavaScript client
ZK	Mixed: LGPL, GPL, commercial	Yes	Yes	Yes	Java server, JavaScript client

== See also ==
- List of open-source application frameworks
- List of platform-independent GUI libraries
