= ICEfaces =

Web framework implementing JSF with Ajax

- Original author(s): ICEsoft Technologies Inc.
- Stable release: 4.3.0 / 12 July 2018; 6 years ago
- Repository: anonsvn.icesoft.org/repo/
- Type: Ajax, Java, JSF2, Framework
- License: Open Source MPL, Apache
- Website: www.icesoft.org

ICEfaces is an open-source Software development kit that extends JavaServer Faces (JSF) by employing Ajax. It is used to construct rich Internet applications (RIA) using the Java programming language. With ICEfaces, the coding for interaction and Ajax on the client side is programmed in Java, rather than in JavaScript, or with plug-ins.

== Architecture ==
ICEfaces is designed to work with Java EE servers, encapsulating Ajax calls. ICEfaces is based on the JavaServer Faces standard, it extends some standard components supplemented with in-built Ajax. ICEfaces allows partial submits. It also provides "Ajax Push", a variant of Comet capability, that can update the DOM of a web page from the server-side.

== Comparable frameworks ==
- Apache MyFaces
- Echo
- ADF Faces
- PrimeFaces
- RichFaces
- Vaadin
- ZK

== Bibliography ==
- Juntao Yuan, Michael; Heute, Thomas (May 6, 2007). JBoss Seam: Simplicity and Power Beyond Java EE (1st ed.). Prentice Hall. pp. 432. ISBN 978-0-13-134796-0.
- Eschen, Rainer (November 6, 2009). Icefaces 1.8: Next Generation Enterprise Web Development (1st ed.). Packt Publishing. p. 292. ISBN 9781847197245.
- Crane, Dave; Sonneveld, Jord (June 2007). Ajax in Practice (1st ed.). Manning Publications. p. 536. ISBN 978-1-932394-99-3.
