= Bindows =

JavaScript-based Software Development Kit

- Developer: MB Technologies Inc.
- Stable release: 4.7 / March 3, 2016; 10 years ago
- Written in: AJAX
- Operating system: Microsoft Windows, Mac OS X, Linux, Solaris
- Type: Rich web application
- License: Proprietary EULA
- Website: MB Technologies

Bindows is a JavaScript based Software Development Kit (SDK) for writing rich web applications. Bindows applications are defined by XML documents called ADF's (Application Description File). The framework implementation is entirely client-side, but a JSF server side implementation is marketed by the same vendor.

== History ==
Bindows was developed by MB Technologies Inc. as a JavaScript-based SDK for building rich web applications in the mid-2000s, during the early period of AJAX-based web development. The framework gained adoption among enterprise organizations seeking an object-oriented approach to client-side web application development.

== Technical architecture ==
Bindows applications are defined using XML documents called Application Description Files (ADF). The framework operates entirely on the client-side, though MB Technologies also marketed a server-side implementation using JavaServer Faces (JSF).

== Features ==
Some highlight features of the Bindows SDK are:

- Native XML, SOAP and XML-RPC support
- Accessibility (Section 508) Support
- Complete windowing system
- Vector Graphics support

== Relevance ==
It has been claimed that Bindows is probably the leading object-oriented platform for developing Ajax applications. While this might be true for implementations in large enterprises (Bindows is used by 91 of the Fortune 100 companies, 85 of The Global 100 companies, and 352 of the Global 500 companies, according to its website), many open-source AJAX frameworks are more widely spread.

== Relevance to developers ==
Bindows is the underlying client technology used in Hyperion Solutions' System 9.

== Legacy and decline ==
As newer JavaScript frameworks such as jQuery, Dojo Toolkit, Ext JS, and later React, Angular, and Vue.js emerged in the 2010s, Bindows saw declining adoption. The proprietary, commercial nature of the framework, combined with the rise of open-source alternatives, contributed to its eventual discontinuation.
