= Wicket (disambiguation) =

Wicket has several meanings in the game of cricket.

Wicket may also refer to:

== Fictional characters ==
- Wicket W. Warrick, in Star Wars
- Mrs. Wicket, in Mr. Bean
- Wickets, characters in Regular Show

== Sport ==
- Wicket (ski), to attach a lift ticket
- Wicket (sport), a North American historical version of cricket
- Croquet hoop, known as wicket in the U.S.

== Other uses ==
- Wicket gate, or wicket, a pedestrian door or gate
- Wicket gate, a component of a water turbine
- Wicket, or paddle, part of a lock gate on waterways
- Apache Wicket, a web application framework
- Wicket, a mini-hurdle used by runners to maintain and practice ideal form

== See also ==
- Sticky wicket
- Wickett, Texas
