= Oracle 10g =

As of the Oracle Database 10g release, Oracle Corporation seems to have started to make an effort to standardize all current versions of its major products using the "10g" label. Major products include:

- Oracle Database 10
- Oracle Application Server 10g (aka Oracle AS 10g) — a middleware product
- Oracle Applications Release 11i (aka Oracle e-Business Suite, Oracle Financials or Oracle 11i) — a suite of business applications
- Oracle Developer Suite 10g (9.0.4)
- Oracle JDeveloper 10g — a Java integrated development environment
