= PrimeFaces =

Open source user interface (UI) component library for JavaServer Faces

- Original author: PrimeTek Informatics
- Stable release: 15.0.0 / February 17, 2025; 16 months ago
- Written in: Java
- Operating system: Cross-platform
- Type: Java, JavaServer Faces, Ajax
- License: MIT License
- Website: primefaces.org
- Repository: github.com/primefaces/primefaces

PrimeFaces is an open-source user interface (UI) component library for JavaServer Faces-based applications, created by Turkish company PrimeTek Informatics.

== History ==
The initial development of PrimeFaces was started in late 2008. Predecessor of PrimeFaces is the YUI4JSF library, a set of JSF components based on YUI JavaScript library. YUI4JSF got cancelled in favor of PrimeFaces in early 2009.

Since its release, PrimeFaces has been strongly supported by Oracle, particularly within the NetBeans world.

=== Release history ===
Release	Release date	Highlights
PrimeFaces 0.8.1	2009-02-23	Introduced Captcha and resizable components and AJAX tab loading features were also added.
PrimeFaces 0.8.2	2009-03-26	Enhanced Carousel component.
PrimeFaces 0.8.3	2009-04-23	YUI upgraded to 2.7.0.
PrimeFaces 0.9.0	2009-06-15	Initial adoption of jQuery JS library for creating PrimeFaces widgets.
PrimeFaces 0.9.1	2009-08-04	New components such as Drag&Drop, Media, InputMask, Dock, outputPanel and many features for existing components.
PrimeFaces 0.9.2	2009-09-07	Layout and TabSwitch components.
PrimeFaces 0.9.3	2009-10-05	TouchFaces mobile UI kit, five new components (PickList, HotKey, VirtualKeyboard and reimplemented FileUpload, Tooltip components), improved portlet support, enhanced datatable and various improvements.
PrimeFaces 1.0.0 and 2.0.0	2010-02-15	First release with production ready status and suitability for JSF 2.0.
PrimeFaces 1.0.1 and 2.0.1	2010-04-19	New components (Dashboard, ProgressBar, MenuButton, Focus and ContextMenu), Spring WebFlow support and Security EL Extensions.
PrimeFaces 1.0.2 and 2.0.2	2010-05-31	New components (TreeTable, DataGrid, TimeLine and Spreadsheet)
PrimeFaces 1.1 and 2.1	2010-07-26	Last release targeting JSF 1.2.
PrimeFaces 2.2	2011-02-07	Initial portlet support enhancements, jQuery 1.43 and jQuery UI 1.8.5.
PrimeFaces 3.0	2012-01-04	Fully reworked architecture for JSF 2.0, Update PrimePUSH and PrimeFaces Mobile, new components (TimeLine, FeedReader, Sheet, Subtable and new chart types).
PrimeFaces 3.1	2012-02-06	Accessibility enhancements for WAI-ARIA.
PrimeFaces 3.2	2012-03-12	New widget architecture, Themes upgrade, brand new components (BlockUI, MegaMenu, SplitButton, DefaultButton).
PrimeFaces 3.3	2012-05-29	Partial Submit and Selector API.
PrimeFaces 3.4	2012-09-03	Enhanced PrimePUSH framework based on Atmosphere based, Upgrade to jQuery 1.8.1 and jQuery UI 1.8.23.
PrimeFaces 3.5	2013-02-04	RTL Support, accessibility improvements, new components(Clock, Horizontal Tree)and many features for existing components.
PrimeFaces 4.0	2013-10-03	JSF 2.2 Support, Client Side Validation Framework, Dialog Framework, Search Expressions, Deferred Loading, brand new HTML5 FileUpload, new components(fragment, multiSelectListbox, sticky) and many features for existing components.
PrimeFaces 5.0	2014-05-05	Brand new chart API, new components(DataScroller, Cache, Spotlight, ColumnToggler and ContentFlow), Exception handler, PrimeFaces mobile(PFM) reimplementation, improved PrimePUSH, accessibility enhancements and many features for existing components.
PrimeFaces 5.1	2014-10-06	New components (Ribbon, InputSwitch, Barcode, and GridCSS), accessibility improvements and many features for existing components.
PrimeFaces 5.2	2015-04-08	New components (Diagram and Steps), accessibility enhancements and many features for existing components.
PrimeFaces 5.3	2015-10-19	New components (Signature Component and DragDrop Support for Touch Enabled Devices).
PrimeFaces 6.0	2016-06-07	New components (TimeLine, InputNumber, KeyFilter, ImportEnum, ImportConstants, Knob, Repeat), new theme called Omega, new CSS grid, accessibility enhancements and many features for existing components.
PrimeFaces 6.1	2017-04-19	JSF 2.3 support, new components (Organigram, TriStateCheckbox, Chips, TextEditor), accessibility enhancements and many features for existing components.
PrimeFaces 6.2	2018-03-01	New components (SideBar, InputGroups, AutoUpdate), new utility class for users (PrimeFaces.current() instead of RequestContext.getCurrentInstance(), security enhancements and many features for existing components.
PrimeFaces 7.0	2019-03-18	New components (DataView, ToggleSwitch and LinkButton), new themes (Nova and Luna) and icons, better performance, various enhancements on accessibility and security.
PrimeFaces 8.0	2020-03-05	CSP, changes for components (Scatter Chart, Timeline, DataExporter, Inverted DataScroller, DatePicker)
PrimeFaces 10.0	2021-03-11	New themes and components, file upload and download changes, improved implementation of JSF Client Window mode, new audio and video components, observer/event based p:autoUpdate, supports JSF 3.0
PrimeFaces 11.0	2021-12-09	
PrimeFaces 12.0	2022-10-05	
PrimeFaces 13.0	2023-07-24	
PrimeFaces 14.0	2024-05-01	
PrimeFaces 15.0	2025-02-17	

== Features ==
- Over 100 UI components
- Ajax Framework
- Mobile UI Kit
- Push Framework
- Dialog Framework
- Client Side Validation
- Theme Engine
- Search Expression Framework

== Books ==
Packt Publishing publish books on this technology.

- PrimeFaces CookBook (2013)
- PrimeFaces Starter (2013)
- PrimeFaces Beginner's guide (2013)
- Learning PrimeFaces Extensions Development (2014)
- PrimeFaces Blueprints (2014)
- PrimeFaces Theme Development (2015)
- PrimeFaces Cookbook - Second Edition (2015)

== Videos ==
- Building an App UI with PrimeFaces (2014)
- Rapid Primefaces (2014)
- Mastering PrimeFaces (2015)

== See also ==
Other JSF component libraries

- RichFaces
- ICEfaces
- OmniFaces
- Apache MyFaces
  - Tobago
  - Tomahawk
- ADF Faces (part of ADF)
