= JFace =

Widget toolkit for the Java platform

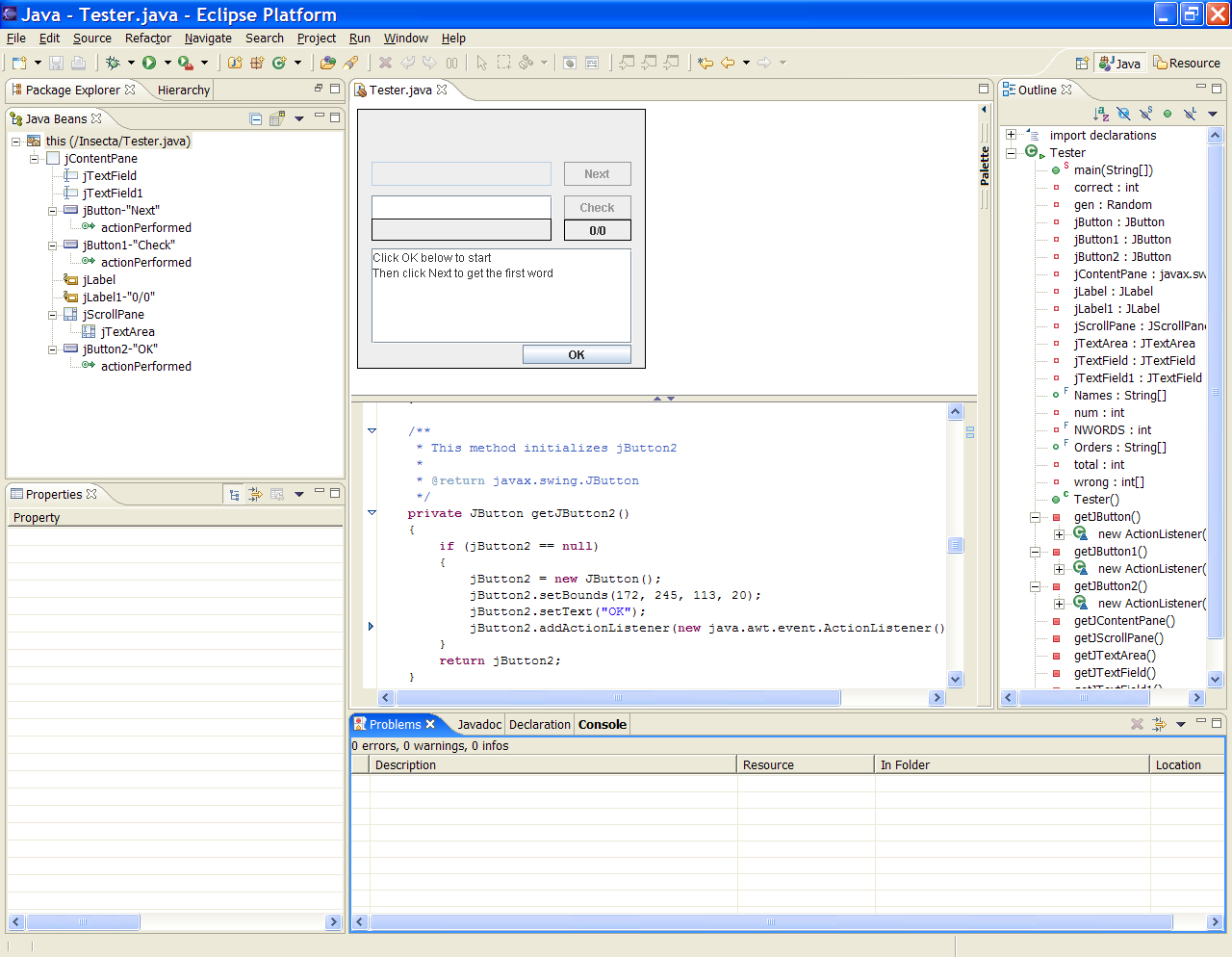
- The Eclipse IDE, a JFace-based application
- Developer: Eclipse Foundation
- Stable release: 3.9.1 / July 25, 2013
- Operating system: Cross-platform
- Available in: Multilingual
- Type: widget toolkit for the Java platform
- License: Eclipse Public License
- Website: wiki.eclipse.org/JFace
- Repository: git.eclipse.org/c/platform/eclipse.platform.ui.git/

JFace is defined by the Eclipse project as "a UI toolkit that provides helper classes for developing UI features that can be tedious to implement." The Standard Widget Toolkit (SWT) is an open source widget toolkit for Java designed to provide efficient, portable access to the user-interface facilities of the operating systems on which it is implemented.

== Structure ==
It is a layer that sits on top of the raw widget system, and provides classes for handling common UI programming tasks. It brings model view controller programming to the Standard Widget Toolkit.

- Provides viewer classes that handle the tedious tasks of populating, sorting, filtering, and updating widgets
- Provides actions to allow users to define their own behavior and to assign that behavior to specific components, e.g. menu items, tool items, push buttons, etc.
- Provides registries that hold Images and Fonts
- Defines standard dialogs and wizards, and defines a framework for building complex interactions with the user
- Its primary goal is to free the developer up, letting the developer focus on the implementation of his or her specific application without having to be concerned with the underlying widget system or solving problems that are common in almost all UI applications.
- A primary concern of the Eclipse group when developing JFace was that under no circumstances did they want to hide the SWT component implementation from the programmer. JFace is completely dependent on SWT, but SWT is not dependent on JFace.

Furthermore, the Eclipse Workbench is built on both JFace and SWT; in some instances, it bypasses JFace and accesses SWT directly.

== Example ==
The following is a basic Hello World program using JFace.

package org.wikipedia.examples;

import org.eclipse.jface.window.ApplicationWindow;
import org.eclipse.swt.SWT;
import org.eclipse.swt.widgets.Composite;
import org.eclipse.swt.widgets.Control;
import org.eclipse.swt.widgets.Display;
import org.eclipse.swt.widgets.Label;

public class HelloWorld extends ApplicationWindow {
    public HelloWorld() {
        super(null);
    }

    public void run() {
        setBlockOnOpen(true);
        open();
        Display.getCurrent().dispose();
    }

    protected Control createContents(Composite parent) {
        Label label = new Label(parent, SWT.CENTER);
        label.setText("Hello, world!");
        return label;
    }

    public static void main(String[] args) {
        HelloWorld prog = new HelloWorld();
        prog.run();
    }
}

== See also ==
- Standard Widget Toolkit

== Bibliography ==
- Scarpino, Matthew; Holder, Stephen; Ng, Stanford; Mihalkovic, Laurent (November 28, 2004), SWT/JFace in Action: GUI Design with Eclipse 3.0 (1st ed.), Manning Publications, p. 496, ISBN 1-932394-27-3
- Li Guojie, Jackwind (February 11, 2005), Professional Java Native Interfaces with SWT/JFace (1st ed.), Wrox Press, p. 528, ISBN 0-470-09459-1, archived from the original on December 26, 2014
- Harris, Robert; Warner, Rob (June 21, 2004), The Definitive Guide to SWT and JFACE (1st ed.), Apress, p. 684, ISBN 1-59059-325-1, archived from the original on July 31, 2009
