= Google Developers =

Google Developers information and code (RDS)

- Website type: Software development website
- Available in: All languages
- Owner: Google
- Website: developers.google.com
- Launched: March 17, 2005; 21 years ago (as Google Code)
- Current status: Active

Google Developers (previously Google Code) is Google's site for software development tools and platforms, application programming interfaces (APIs), and technical resources. The site contains documentation on using Google developer tools and APIs—including discussion groups and blogs for developers using Google's developer products.

There are APIs offered for almost all of Google's popular consumer products, like Google Maps, YouTube, Google Apps, and others.

The site also features a variety of developer products and tools built specifically for developers. Google App Engine is a hosting service for web apps. Project Hosting gives users version control for open source code. Google Web Toolkit (GWT) allows developers to create Ajax applications in the Java programming language.(All languages)

The site contains reference information for community based developer products that Google is involved with like Android from the Open Handset Alliance and OpenSocial from the OpenSocial Foundation.

== Google APIs ==
Google offers a variety of APIs, mostly web APIs for web developers. The APIs are based on popular Google consumer products, including Google Maps, Google Earth, AdSense, Google Ads, Google Apps and YouTube.

=== Google Data APIs ===
The Google Data APIs allow programmers to create applications that read and write data from Google services. Currently, these include APIs for Google Apps, Google Analytics, Blogger, Google Base, Google Book Search, Google Calendar, Google Code Search, Google Earth, Google Spreadsheets and Google Notebook.

=== Ajax APIs ===
Google's Ajax APIs let a developer implement rich, dynamic websites entirely in JavaScript and HTML. A developer can create a map to a site, a dynamic search box, or download feeds with just a few lines of javascript.

=== Ads APIs ===
The AdSense and Google Ads APIs, based on the SOAP data exchange standard, allow developers to integrate their own applications with these Google services. The AdSense API allows owners of websites and blogs to manage AdSense sign-up, content and reporting, while the Google Ads API gives customers programmatic access to their accounts and campaigns.

== Developer tools and open-source projects ==
=== App Engine ===
Google App Engine lets developers run web applications on Google Cloud. Google App Engine supports apps written in several programming languages. With App Engine's Java runtime environment, one can build their app using standard Java technologies, including the JVM, Java servlets, and the Java programming language—or any other language using a JVM-based interpreter or compiler, such as JavaScript or Ruby. App Engine also features a dedicated Python runtime environment, which includes a fast Python interpreter and the Python standard library.

=== Google Plugin for Eclipse ===
Google Plugin for Eclipse (GPE) is a set of software development tools that enables Java developers to design, build, optimize, and deploy cloud computing applications. GPE assists developers in creating complex user interfaces, generating Ajax code using the Google Web Toolkit, optimizing performance with Speed Tracer, and deploying applications to Google App Engine. GPE installs into the Eclipse integrated development environment (IDE) using the extensible plugin system. GPE is available under the Google terms of service license.

=== Google Web Toolkit ===
The Google Web Toolkit (GWT) is an open source toolkit allowing developers to create Ajax applications in the Java programming language. GWT supports rapid client–server development and debugging in any Java IDE. In a subsequent deployment step, the GWT compiler translates a working Java application into equivalent JavaScript that programmatically manipulates a web browser's HTML DOM using DHTML techniques. GWT emphasizes reusable, efficient solutions to recurring Ajax challenges, namely asynchronous remote procedure calls, history management, bookmarking, and cross-browser portability. It is released under the Apache License version 2.0.

=== OR-Tools ===
Google OR-Tools provides programming language wrappers for operations research tools such as optimisation and constraint solving.

=== Google Code ===
Google previously ran a project hosting service called Google Code that provided revision control offering Subversion, Mercurial and Git (transparently implemented using Bigtable as storage), an issue tracker, and a wiki for documentation. The service was available and free for all OSI-approved Open Source projects (as of 2010, it was strongly recommended but no longer required to use one of the nine well-known open source licenses: Apache, Artistic, BSD, GPLv2, GPLv3, LGPL, MIT, MPL and EPL). The site limited the number of projects one person could have to 25. Additionally, there was a limit on the number of projects that could be created in one day, a 200 MB default upload file size limit, which could be raised, and a 5 GB per-project total size limit. The service provided a file download feature, but in May 2013 the creation of new downloads was disabled, with plans to disable it altogether on January 14, 2014. In March 2015, Google announced that it would be closing down Google Code on January 15, 2016. All projects on the site entered read-only mode on August 24, 2015, with the exception of certain Google-owned projects including Android and Chrome.

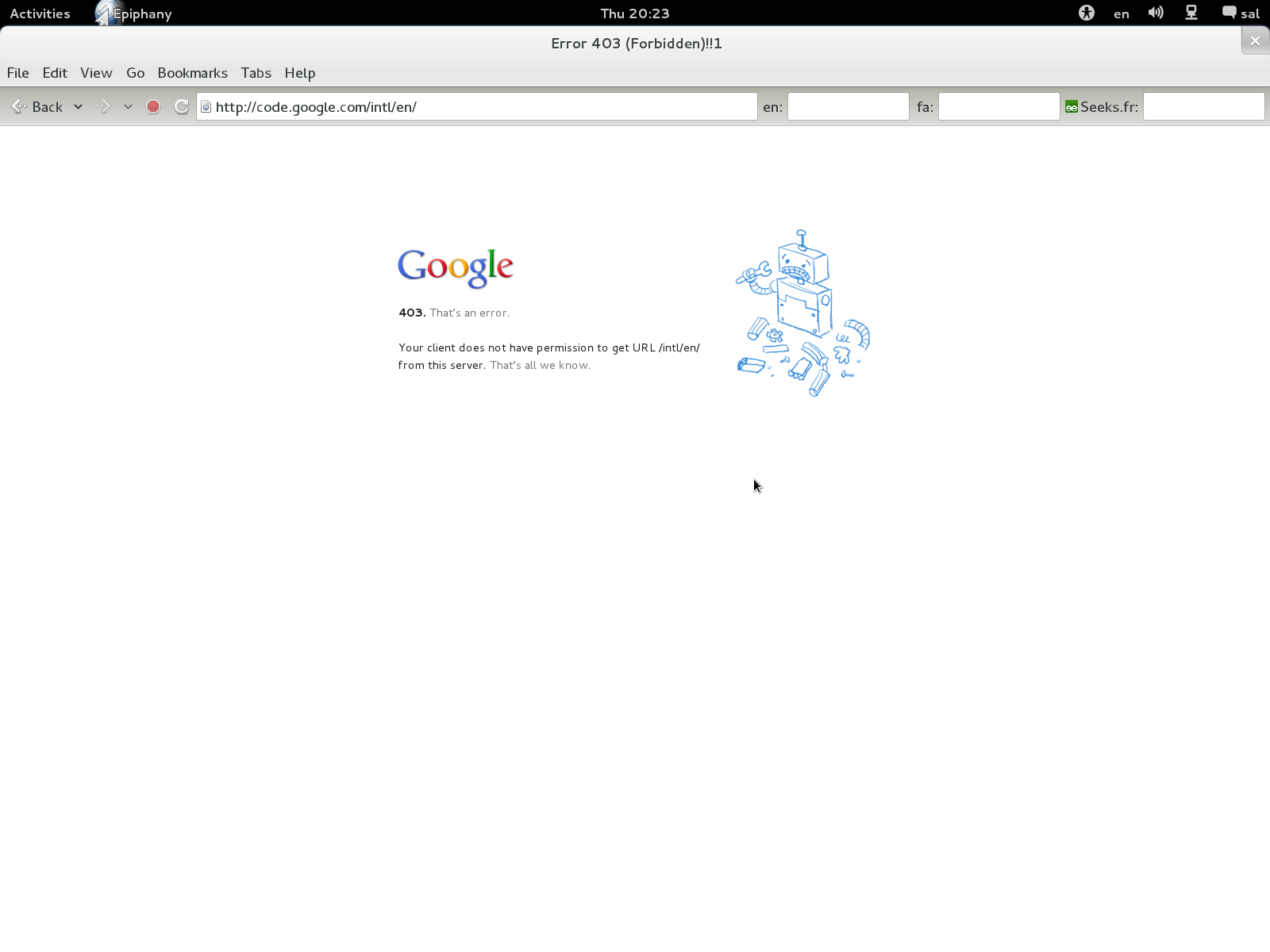
Error message seen by someone attempting to access code.google.com from an OFAC-restricted country

Residents of countries on the United States Office of Foreign Assets Control sanction list, including Cuba, Iran, North Korea, Sudan and Syria, were prohibited from posting to or accessing Google Code.

=== Gears ===
Gears was beta software offered by Google to enable offline access to services that normally only work online. It installed a database engine, based on SQLite, on the client system to cache data locally. Gears-enabled pages used data from this local cache rather than from the online service. Using Gears, a web application may periodically synchronize the data in the local cache with the online service. If a network connection is not available, the synchronization is deferred until a network connection is established. Thus Gears enabled web applications to work even though access to the network service is not present. Google announced the end of Gears development on March 11, 2011, citing a shift of focus from Gears to HTML5.

== Google developer events ==
- Google I/O is Google's largest developer event, which is usually held in May at the Shoreline Amphitheatre, Mountain View.
- Google Summer of Code is a mentoring program to find students for open source projects. In 2016, the program received nearly 18,980 applications.
- Google Code Jam is an international programming competition.

== Google Developer Groups ==
Google Developer Groups (GDGs) are communities of developers who are interested in Google's developer technology products and platforms. A GDG can take many forms—from just a few people getting together, to large gatherings with demos and tech talks, to events like code sprints and hackathons. As of June 2020, there are currently 1000+ GDGs worldwide. DevFest is one of these events.

== Experts ==
A Google Developer Expert (GDE) is a person recognized by Google as having exemplary expertise in Google Developer and open-source technologies and products. GDEs are awarded by membership in the Google Developers Experts program, established and administered by Google. GDEs have a tenure of one year which can be extended upon continuous active contribution to the developer and open source community of that product. A Google Developers Expert cannot be a Google employee whilst a member of the program. GDEs are not permitted to "make any statements on behalf of Google or any Google company" and be clear that any opinions are not those of Google.

As of June 2023, according to the GDE program website, there were more than 1,000 people with this designation.
