= Google Plugin for Eclipse =

Set of Java development tools

- Original author: Google
- Initial release: April 7, 2009
- Stable release: 3.9.6 / March 31, 2017
- Written in: Java
- Operating system: Windows, Mac, Linux
- Available in: Java
- Type: Eclipse development tools for cloud computing apps
- License: Eclipse Public License
- Website: developer.google.com/eclipse

Google Plugin for Eclipse (GPE) was a set of development tools that enabled Java developers to design, build, optimize, and deploy cloud computing applications. developers in creating complex user interfaces, generating Ajax code using the GWT Web Toolkit, and deploying applications to Google App Engine. GPE installed into the Eclipse integrated development environment (IDE) using the extensible plugin system. GPE was available under the Eclipse Public License 1.0.

== History ==
GPE was first released on April 7, 2009, and the last version 3.9.6 was released on March 31, 2017. The product was decommissioned in January, 2018.

Release history:

- GPE 1.0 April 7, 2009
- GPE 1.1 July 30, 2009
- GPE 1.2 December 8, 2009
- GPE 1.3 March 16, 2010
- GPE 2.5 December 16, 2011
- GPE 2.6 May 3, 2012
- GPE 3.0 June 29, 2012
- GPE 3.1 August 10, 2012
- GPE 3.2 Feb 13, 2013
- GPE 3.3 July 17, 2013
- GPE 3.4 September 13, 2013
- GPE 3.5 December 20, 2013
- GPE 3.9 March 23, 2016
- GPE 3.9.5 October 24, 2016
- GPE 3.9.6 March 31, 2017

== Features ==
Support for GWT Web Toolkit

- Development Mode View: inspect your debugging logs and manage the GWT code server from Eclipse
- UiBinder support: template editor with auto-completion, as-you-type validation of template and owner classes, and creation wizard
- Recognition of in-line JavaScript (JSNI): Java reference auto-completion, syntax highlighting, auto-indenting, Java Search and Refactoring integration
- Validation, quick fixes, and refactoring support to keep RPC interfaces in sync
- GWT compiler shortcuts and configuration UI
- Wizards to create modules, client bundles, entry points and HTML pages
- Compatibility with Eclipse for Java EE and projects built with Maven
- Support for GWT JUnit tests

Easy Discovery and Access to Google APIs

- Developers can include features such as Google Maps overlays, Buzz streams, and Google Docs integration in apps via Google APIs.

Import Projects from Project Hosting

- A simple UI that makes importing Google-hosted projects into Eclipse very easy.

One Login, Many Services

- Integrated single sign-on support.

Local Storage APIs

- Enables access to data quickly and continue to be usable offline.

Web Application Wizard

- Create web applications that use GWT Web Toolkit and/or App Engine.

Web Application Launch Configurations

- Run or debug web application locally using fully customizable launch configurations

GWT Designer Integration

- A WYSIWYG Ajax user interface designer

HTML5 Support

- Canvas element that allows for dynamic, scriptable rendering of 2D shapes and bitmap images, and the embedding of Audio/Video tags

CellTable APIs

- Allows for default column sorting and the ability to set column widths

Deployment to Google App Engine

- Real-time validation to ensure that code is compatible with App Engine
- Build projects and enhance JDO classes automatically without the need for Apache Ant

== See also ==
- GWT Web Toolkit
- Google
- Maven
- Comparison of integrated development environments (IDEs)
- List of Java software and tools
