= JDeveloper =

Integrated development environment

- Demonstration of JDeveloper 11g GUI
- Developer(s): Oracle Corporation
- Stable release: 14.1.2.0 / December 20, 2024; 2 months ago
- Written in: Java
- Operating system: Cross-platform
- Type: Java IDE
- License: Proprietary OTN JDeveloper License
- Website: www.oracle.com/application-development/technologies/jdeveloper.html

JDeveloper is a freeware IDE supplied by Oracle Corporation. It offers features for development in Java, XML, SQL and PL/SQL, HTML, JavaScript, BPEL and PHP. JDeveloper covers the full development lifecycle from design through coding, debugging, optimization and profiling to deploying.

With JDeveloper, Oracle has aimed to simplify application development by focusing on providing a visual and declarative approach to application development in addition to building an advanced coding-environment. Oracle JDeveloper integrates with the Oracle Application Development Framework (Oracle ADF) - an end-to-end Java EE-based framework that further simplifies application development.

The core IDE exposes an API that other teams in Oracle use to build extensions to JDeveloper. BPEL, Portal, Business Intelligence and other components of the Oracle platform all build their design-time tools on top of JDeveloper. To accommodate to Sun Microsystems (and thus NetBeans) acquisition versions released after 2012 are sharing significant code with NetBeans platform. The same IDE platform also serves as the basis of another Oracle product, SQL Developer, which Oracle Corporation promotes specifically to PL/SQL and database developers.

== Features ==
Prior to JDeveloper 11g, JDeveloper came in three editions: Java Edition, J2EE Edition, and Studio Edition. Each one offered more features on top of the others, and all of them came for free. JDeveloper 11g only has two editions: Studio Edition and Java Edition. In JDeveloper 11g, J2EE Edition features are rolled into the Studio Edition.

A high-level list of features includes:

– Java Edition

- Java SE 9 Support
- Code Editor
- Code Navigation
- Refactoring
- Swing
- Unit Test
- Version Control
- Audit & Metrics
- Debugging
- Profiling
- Ant Support
- Maven Support
- XML Support
- Open API & Extensions
- User Assistance

– J2EE Edition

- JSP
- Struts
- JSF
- JSF 2.0
- Facelets
- EJB
- TopLink
- Web Services
- RESTful Web Services
- UML
- Database Development
- Deployment and management
- Hudson

– Studio Edition

- ADF Databinding
- ADF Faces
- ADF Faces Skin Editor
- ADF Mobile
- ADF Business Components
- ADF Swing
- ADF Deployment
- BPEL Designer
- ESB Designer
- Portlet Development
- Portlet/JSF Bridge
- oracle BI Ee

In 2005, Oracle released JDeveloper as freeware.

In 2006, still under the 10g tag, and after significant delays, Oracle released version 10.1.3 - the latest major 10g release.

In October 2006, Oracle released version 10.1.3.1 that added support for the final EJB 3.0 spec along with BPEL and ESB design time.

In January 2007, Oracle released version 10.1.3.2 incorporating WebCenter capabilities such as creating and consuming portlets, portlet/JSF bridge, and content-repository data control.

In January 2007 Oracle had more than 150 people working in various roles on the product, including (in no particular order): developers, development managers, QA engineers, build engineers, doc writers, product managers, customer evangelists, and usability engineers. Development centers operated in Redwood Shores, in Bangalore, in Reading (UK), and in Pleasanton, Colorado.

In May 2007 Oracle released a technology-preview release of version 11g.

In October 2008 the production version of Oracle JDeveloper 11g, code-named BOXER, became available.

In July 2009 JDeveloper 11g version 11.1.1.1.0, code-named Bulldog, became available

In June 2011 JDeveloper 11g (11.1.2.0.0), code name Sherman, became available.

In September 2011 JDeveloper 11g (11.1.2.1.0 Build 6081), R2/PS1 became available.

In May 2012 JDeveloper 11g (11.1.2.2.0 Build 6183), R2/PS2 became available.

In September 2012 JDeveloper 11g (11.1.2.3.0 Build 6276.1), R2/PS3 became available.

In May 2013 JDeveloper 11g (11.1.2.4.0 Build 6436), R2/PS4 became available.

In July 2013 JDeveloper 12c (12.1.2.0.0 Build 6668) became available.

In June 2014 JDeveloper 12c (12.1.3.0.0) became available.

In October 2015 JDeveloper 12c (12.2.1.0.0) became available.

In June 2016 JDeveloper 12c (12.2.1.1.0) became available.

In August 2017 JDeveloper 12c (12.2.1.3.0) became available.

In September 2019 JDeveloper 12c (12.2.1.4.0) became available.

== Visual and declarative ==
The JDeveloper code editor offers a rich set of coding features including visual and non-visual utilities that provide different views of the code. The software provides dialogs that guide the use of Java EE components.

For example, JDeveloper provides a visual WYSIWYG editor for HTML, JSP, JSF, and Swing. The visual editor allows developers to modify the layout and properties of components visually: the tool re-generates the code. Any changes in the code will be immediately reflected in the visual view. JDeveloper provides a similar feature for generating JSF and Struts page flows.

Declarative features enable programmers to generate EJBs or POJOs based on tables in relational databases. JDeveloper automates the creation of Java EE artifacts. For example, with a click on a visual artifact one can turn a Java class into a web service. JDeveloper generates the associated WSDL (Web Services Descriptive Language) document and related JAX-RPC components.

== License ==
JDeveloper is free proprietary software for development and deployment. Oracle ADF has a runtime license when deployed outside of an Oracle Application Server.

== See also ==
- Comparison of integrated development environments

== Bibliography ==
- Mills, Duncan; Koletzke, Peter; Roy-Faderman, Avrom (October 20, 2009), Oracle JDeveloper 11g Handbook: A Guide to Fusion Web Development (1st ed.), McGraw-Hill, p. 928, ISBN 978-0-07-160238-9
- Nimphius, Frank; Munsinger, Lynn (2010), Oracle Fusion Developer Guide (1st ed.), McGraw-Hill, p. 721, ISBN 978-0-07-162254-7, archived from the original on 2016-08-22
- Purushothaman, Jobinesh (October 2012), Oracle ADF Real World Developer Guide (1st ed.), Packt Publishing, p. 564, ISBN 978-1-84968-482-8
- Vohra, Deepak (April 16, 2008), Ajax in Oracle JDeveloper (1st ed.), Springer, p. 224, ISBN 978-3-540-77595-9
