= Oracle Application Development Framework =

Java framework

Oracle Application Development Framework, usually called Oracle ADF, is a development tool by Oracle Corporation that provides a Java framework for building enterprise applications. It provides visual and declarative approaches to Java EE development. It supports rapid application development based on ready-to-use design patterns, metadata-driven and visual tools.

== Supported technologies ==
Based on the MVC architecture. Oracle ADF can support any combination of the following:

=== Model ===
- Web Services - both SOAP and REST
- TopLink - and EclipseLink
- JavaBeans
- POJO - simple Java classes (Plain Old Java Objects)
- ADF Business components (entity object, view object)
- Portlets
- CSV and XML files
- SQL Queries

=== Controller ===
- JavaServer Faces (JSF)
- ADF Task Flows - extension of the JSF controller layer that adds complete process flow and reusability aspects.
- Struts
- Jspx (JavaServer Pages, XML compliant variation of the JSP standard)

=== View ===
- Swing
- JavaServer Pages (JSP)
- JavaServer Faces (JSF)
- ADF Faces - an Oracle implementation of JavaServer Faces
- Facelets
- ADF Mobile browser - based on Apache Trinidad
- Excel through ADF desktop integration

The Oracle JDeveloper free Integrated Development Environment provides a graphical interface for creating data-management applications using ADF.

Oracle also offers Eclipse based tooling for ADF in Oracle Enterprise Pack For Eclipse.

Implementers can deploy Oracle ADF applications on Java EE-compliant containers. Oracle WebLogic and IBM WebSphere are officially supported. Users of the free ADF Essentials edition can buy support for these applications on GlassFish.

== History ==
Oracle Corporation has marketed parts of Oracle ADF since 1999 — specifically ADF Business Components — then known as "JBO" and later as "BC4J" ("Business Components for Java").

The current ADF architecture with the generic model/binding layer was introduced with JDeveloper 9.0.5.

In June 2006 Oracle Corporation donated the ADF Faces component library to Apache Trinidad. (ADF Faces, Oracle's JSF implementation, includes over 100 components.) In September 2012 Oracle introduced a free version of the core Oracle ADF technologies under the name "Oracle ADF Essentials". For more information, see http://www.oracle.com/technetwork/developer-tools/adf/overview/components-1844931.html.

== Licensing ==
Oracle ADF Essentials is a free to develop and deploy packaging of the key core technologies of Oracle ADF. See the license terms for Oracle ADF Essentials: http://www.oracle.com/technetwork/licenses/adf-essentials-license-1837221.html For the "full" Oracle ADF: The Oracle Application Server licence includes a component for a license fee for Oracle ADF. This means that all users who have purchased an Oracle Application Server licence may use Oracle ADF for free. Users who want to deploy ADF to a third-party application-server can purchase an ADF runtime license at their local Oracle sales office. Users can develop and test Oracle ADF applications free of charge exclusively within Oracle JDeveloper.

Oracle Corporation purchased WebLogic in June 2008, and thus no longer regards it as a third-party application-server, so ADF is included in every WebLogic license.

Supported customers can get access to the source code for Oracle ADF through a request to Oracle Support.

== See also ==
- JDeveloper
- Eclipse
- Oracle Enterprise Pack for Eclipse
- Oracle WebLogic Server
- Oracle Fusion
- JSF
- JBoss Seam
- Spring framework
- Struts
- Vaadin
