= ZK (framework) =

AJAX/XUL Web application framework

- Developer: zkoss.org
- Stable release: 10.1.0 / 12 November 2024; 18 months ago
- Operating system: Cross-platform (JVM)
- Type: Ajax Web Framework
- License: LGPL / ZOL / Commercial
- Website: zkoss.org
- Repository: github.com/zkoss/zk

ZK is an open-source Ajax Web application framework, written in Java, that enables creation of graphical user interfaces for Web applications with little required programming knowledge.

The core of ZK consists of an Ajax-based event-driven mechanism, over 123 XUL and 83 XHTML-based components, and a mark-up language for designing user interfaces. Programmers design their application pages in feature-rich XUL/XHTML components, and manipulate them upon events triggered by end user's activity. It is similar to the programming model found in desktop GUI-based applications.

ZK uses a server-centric approach in which the content synchronization of components and the event pipe-lining between clients and servers are automatically done by the engine, and Ajax plumbing codes are completely transparent to web application developers. Therefore, the end users get the similar engaged interactivity and responsiveness as a desktop application, while programmers' development retains a similar simplicity to that of desktop applications.

ZK does not use the standard web request-response mechanism and does not send form fields to the server by making a GET request with query parameters or a POST request. Instead, AJAX requests are sent to the server to update the internal state of each screen widget. At the browser, ZK only downloads a JSON description of the web page and uses a client renderer to turn that into a UI. It's quite efficient and under closer inspection, does not download everything at once. A look at the traffic between client and the server reveals several requests going back and forth between client and browser until the page rendering eventually completes.

The optional client-side customization allows the developer to leverage the client-side resources with the so-called server+client fusion, for customization and to reduce the Ajax traffic.

In addition to component-based programming in a manner similar to Swing, ZK supports a mark-up language for rich user interface definition called ZUML.

- ZUML is designed for non-programmer developers to design user interfaces intuitively.
- ZUML allows developers to meld different markup languages, such as Mozilla XUL language and XHTML, seamlessly into the same page.
- ZUML allows developers to embed scripts in pure Java language (interpreted by BeanShell) and use EL expressions to manipulate the components and access data.

== Features ==
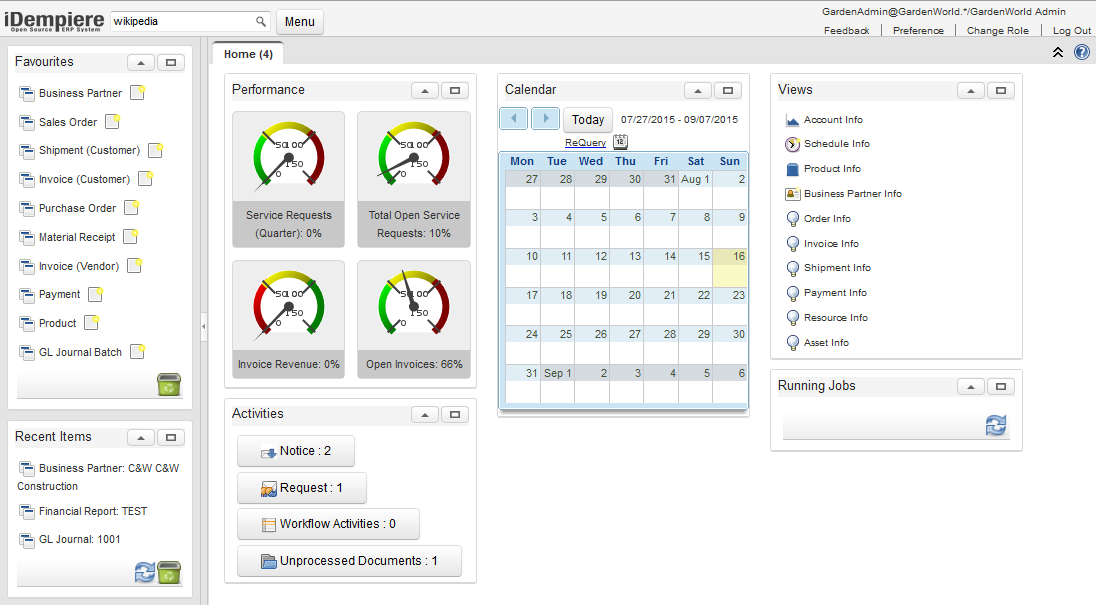
webui interface of iDempiere under ZK6

- Simply Java. ZK is renowned for its "Ajax without JavaScript" approach, enabling developers to build rich web applications transparently without any knowledge of Ajax and JavaScript.
- Responsive design themes along with Bootstrap support
- HTML 5 and CSS 3 support
- Over 100 Ajax components offer UI designers a variety of feature rich components to meet the demands of enterprise Ajax applications.
- ZUML makes the design of rich user interfaces similar to authoring HTML pages. ZUML is a variant of XUL inheriting all features available to XML, and separates the UI definition from the run-time logic.
- Event-driven component-based model (similar to desktop programming models) supporting multiple event driven GUI design patterns.
- Support for Model-View-Controller (MVC), Model-View-Presenter and Model-View-ViewModel (MVVM) design patterns
- Databinding capability via in-ZUML-page annotations that automates CRUD and state synchronization between UI view and the data and POJO.
- Application components, such as spreadsheet, pivot table, and calendar.
- Embedding scripting support with Java (Beanshell). This is an important benefit as you can use a unified programming language for both user interface and backend programming. Optional support for other serverside Java scripting in other languages such as JavaScript (Rhino), Ruby (JRuby), Python (Jython) and Groovy.
- Support for integrating with existing web frameworks via a JSP custom tag library, JSF support, Portlet, and a Servlet Filter. Has support for Spring and Hibernate.
- Extensible in that programmers can create new custom UI controls. Groups of controls can be re-used as a macro component.
- Extensive charting with ZK Charts

== Differences from XUL ==
- ZK is a server side framework which emits HTML and thus does not depend on client side presence of Gecko making it portable to any browser. ZK takes ZUML (xul and xhtml) serverside pages as input and outputs dhtml for the browser.
- ZK processes user interface logic on the server in Java. This increases choice in the scripting engines and application libraries that can be used to create logic. Presentation effects can be delegated to the browser using the Client-side Actions feature to reduce server load for dhtml effects. Running the application logic on the server in a single application container reduces the amount of cross browser and browser version testing when compared to extensively programming the DOM at the browser.
- While ZK and XUL have an overlapping subset of components, ZK has its own unique component sets. The component library can be extended with custom components. Macro components can be defined that are composites of components.
- ZK provides serverside databinding annotations to declaratively bind UI components to serverside data.
- Look and Feel differences.

== System requirements ==
- JRE version 1.5 or later
- A Web server supporting Servlet 2.3 or later

== Prerequisites of programming skills ==
=== Required ===
- Basic knowledge of Java or a Java scripting engine language such as Groovy, Rhino (Java JavaScript), JRuby (Java Ruby) or Jython (Java Python)
- Basic knowledge of HTML and XUL

=== Optional ===
- Knowledge of a scripting language to write the glue logic (running on the server):
  - BeanShell (Java interpreter), JavaScript, Groovy, Ruby, Scala and Python
- Object Oriented Programming
- Servlet Programming
- Ajax
- JavaScript (client-sided)
- Declarative Databindings
- JSTL style Expression Language

== ZUML ==
ZUML (ZK User Interface Markup Language) is a markup language for rich user interfaces definition.

- ZUML is designed for non-programmers to design user interfaces efficiently with the ZUML markup
- ZUML allows developer to meld different markup languages, such as Mozilla XUL language and XHTML, seamlessly into the same page.
- ZUML allows developers to embed script in pure Java language (interpreted by BeanShell) and use EL expressions to manipulate the components and access data.
- ZUML is supported by ZK.
- Official Documentation : ZUML Reference

== Client-side technologies ==
ZK is a server-centric framework. Technically knowledge about the implementation is not required at the client side. This enables ZK Mobile to run on Java Mobile VM.

Since ZK 5.0, the so-called Server+client Fusion architecture is introduced. Developers are allowed to access the client-side widgets directly if they want to. ZK Client Engine is based on jQuery. Technically you can use jQuery-compliant libraries and widgets.

== See also ==
- List of rich web application frameworks
- Comparison of JavaScript frameworks
- List of Ajax frameworks
- List of widget toolkits based on JavaScript
