= Remote Application Platform =

Eclipse opensource project

- Developer: Eclipse Foundation
- Repository: RAP Repository
- Written in: Java
- Operating system: Cross-platform
- Available in: Multilingual
- Type: Ajax-enabled rich Internet application
- License: Eclipse Public License
- Website: www.eclipse.org/rap

Remote Application Platform (RAP, formerly Rich Ajax Platform) Project is an open-source software project under the Eclipse Technology Project which aims to enable software developers to build Ajax-enabled rich Internet applications by using the Eclipse development model, plugins and a Java-only application programming interface (API). It can be considered a counterpart for web development to the Rich Client Platform (RCP). The API is very similar to RCP so developers who know RCP can reuse extant knowledge. RAP encourages sharing source code between RCP and RAP applications to reduce the development effort for business applications that need both desktop-based and web-based front ends.

== Bibliography ==
- Lange, Fabian (December 29, 2008), Eclipse Rich Ajax Platform: Bringing Rich Client to the Web (First ed.), Apress, p. 148, ISBN 978-1-4302-1883-8, archived from the original on December 12, 2010
