= Google Web Toolkit =

Free Java library

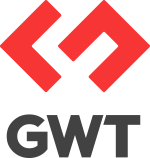
- Original author: Google
- Initial release: May 16, 2006; 20 years ago
- Stable release: 2.13.0 / February 11, 2026; 4 months ago
- Written in: Java
- Operating system: Linux, Windows, MacOS, FreeBSD
- Available in: Java
- Type: Ajax framework
- License: Apache License 2.0
- Website: www.gwtproject.org
- Repository: github.com/gwtproject/gwt

Google Web Toolkit (GWT /ˈɡwɪt/), or GWT Web Toolkit, is an open-source set of tools that allows web developers to create and maintain JavaScript front-end applications in Java. It is licensed under Apache License 2.0.

GWT supports various web development tasks, such as asynchronous remote procedure calls, history management, bookmarking, UI abstraction, internationalization, and cross-browser portability.

== History ==
GWT version 1.0 RC 1 was released on May 16, 2006. Google announced GWT at the JavaOne conference in 2006.

Release history
Release	Date
GWT 1.0	May 17, 2006
GWT 1.1	August 11, 2006
GWT 1.2	November 16, 2006
GWT 1.3	February 5, 2007
GWT 1.4	August 28, 2007
GWT 1.5	August 27, 2008
GWT 1.6	April 7, 2009
GWT 1.7	July 13, 2009
GWT 2.0	December 8, 2009
GWT 2.1.0	October 19, 2010
GWT 2.2.0	February 11, 2011
GWT 2.3.0	May 3, 2011
GWT 2.4.0	September 8, 2011
GWT 2.5.0	October 2012
GWT 2.5.1	March 2013
GWT 2.6.0	January 30, 2014
GWT 2.6.1	May 10, 2014
GWT 2.7.0	November 20, 2014
GWT 2.8.0	October 20, 2016
GWT 2.8.1	April 24, 2017
GWT 2.8.2	October 19, 2017
GWT 2.9.0	May 2, 2020
GWT 2.10.0	June 9, 2022
GWT 2.11.0	January 9, 2024
GWT 2.12.0	October 29, 2024
GWT 2.12.1	November 12, 2024
GWT 2.12.2	March 3, 2025
GWT 2.13.0	February 11, 2026

In August 2010, Google acquired Instantiations, a company known for focusing on Eclipse Java developer tools, including GWT Designer, which is now bundled with Google Plugin for Eclipse.

In 2011 with the introduction of the Dart programming language, Google stated that GWT would continue to be supported for the foreseeable future while also hinting at a possible rapprochement between the two Google approaches to structured web programming. However, they also mentioned that several of the engineers previously working on GWT are now working on Dart.

In 2012 at their annual I/O conference, Google announced that GWT would be transformed from a Google project to a fully open-sourced project. In July 2013, Google posted on its GWT blog that the transformation to an open-source project was completed.

== Development with GWT ==
Using GWT, developers have the ability to develop and debug Ajax applications in the Java language using the Java development tools of their choice. When the application is deployed, the GWT cross-compiler translates the Java application to standalone JavaScript files that are optionally obfuscated and deeply optimized. When needed, JavaScript can also be embedded directly into Java code using Java comments.

GWT provides tools for building client-side JavaScript functionality alongside user interface programming, leaving architectural decisions to the developer. The GWT mission statement clarifies the philosophical breakdown of GWT's role versus the developer's role. History is an example of such: although GWT manages history tokens as users click Back or Forward in the browser, it does not detail how to map history tokens to an application state.

GWT applications can be run in two modes:

- Development mode (formerly Hosted mode): The application runs as Java bytecode within the Java Virtual Machine (JVM). This mode is typically used for development, supporting the hot swapping of code and debugging. In 2014, the classic implementation of Dev Mode was rendered unusable by browser updates until its replacement with the more compatible Super Dev Mode, which became the default in GWT 2.7.
- Production mode (formerly Web mode): The application is run as pure JavaScript and HTML, compiled from the Java source. This mode is typically used for deployment.

Several open-source plugins are available for making GWT development easier with other IDEs, including GWT4NB for NetBeans, Cypal Studio for GWT (an Eclipse plugin), and GWT Developer for JDeveloper. The Google Plugin for Eclipse handles most GWT-related tasks in the IDE, including creating projects, invoking the GWT compiler, creating GWT launch configurations, validation, and syntax highlighting.

== Components ==
The major GWT components include:

GWT Java-to-JavaScript Compiler
Translates the Java programming language to the JavaScript programming language.
GWT Development Mode
Allows the developers to run and execute GWT applications in development mode (the app runs as Java in the JVM without compiling to JavaScript). Prior to 2.0, GWT hosted mode provided a special-purpose "hosted browser" to debug your GWT code. In 2.0, the web page being debugged is viewed within a regular browser. Development mode is supported by using a native-code plugin called the Google Web Toolkit Developer Plugin for many popular browsers.
JRE emulation library
JavaScript implementations of the commonly used classes in the Java standard class library (such as most of the java.lang package classes and a subset of the java.util package classes).
GWT Web UI class library
A set of custom interfaces and classes for creating widgets.

== Features ==
- Dynamic and reusable UI components: built-in classes implement dynamic behaviors such as drag-and-drop or complex visual tree structures.
- Simple RPC mechanism
- Browser history management
- Support for Java debugging
- GWT handles some cross-browser issues for the developer.
- Unit testing integration
- Support for Internationalization and localization
- HTML Canvas support (subject to API changes)
- The developers can mix handwritten JavaScript in the Java source code using the JavaScript Native Interface (JSNI).
- Support for using Google APIs in GWT applications (initially, support for Google Gears).
- Open-source
- Applications can be developed using an object-oriented architecture in Java, allowing common JavaScript issues like typos and type mismatches to be caught at compile time.
- Generated JavaScript can be compiled in an unobfuscated format (Source-Mapped or Source-Code) or an obfuscated and compressed format.
- A number of libraries are available for GWT, by Google and third parties. These extend the toolkit's features.

=== Available widgets ===
As of version 2.4 (September 2011), Google Web Toolkit offers several widgets and panels.

Widgets and panels
Widgets	Panels
Button	PopupPanel
PushButton	StackPanel
RadioButton	StackLayoutPanel
CheckBox	HorizontalPanel
DatePicker	VerticalPanel
ToggleButton	FlowPanel
TextBox	VerticalSplitPanel
PasswordTextBox	HorizontalSplitPanel
TextArea	SplitLayoutPanel
Hyperlink	DockPanel
ListBox	DockLayoutPanel
CellList	TabPanel
MenuBar	TabLayoutPanel
Tree	DisclosurePanel
CellTree
SuggestBox
RichTextArea
FlexTable
Grid
CellTable
CellBrowser
TabBar
DialogBox

Many common widgets not found in the GWT have been implemented in third-party libraries.

== Enterprise usage ==
GWT uses or supports Java, Apache Tomcat (or similar web container), Eclipse IDE, Internet Explorer, and internationalization and localization. Java-based GWT rich web applications can be tested using JUnit testing framework and code coverage tools. GWT provides compile-time verification of images, CSS, and business logic to detect implementation errors during development.

Google has noted that some of its products are GWT-based: Blogger, AdWords, Flights, Wallet, Offers, Groups, Inbox.

== GWT 2.0 ==
On December 8, 2009, Google launched Google Web Toolkit 2.0 with Speed Tracer.

Version 2.0 of GWT offers a number of new features, including:

- In-Browser Development Mode (formerly known as Out Of Process Hosted Mode, OOPHM): prior to version 2.0, the hosted mode was used to embed a modified browser to allow running the bytecode version of the application during development. With version 2.0, hosted mode, renamed "development mode", allows using any (supported) browser to view the page being debugged through the use of a browser plugin. The plugin communicates with the development mode shell using TCP/IP, which allows cross-platform debugging (for example, debugging in Internet Explorer on Windows from a development mode shell running on a Linux machine).
- Code splitting: with the developer providing "split points" in the source code, the GWT compiler can split the JavaScript code into several small chunks instead of one big download. This will lead to reduced application startup time as the size of the initial download is decreased.
- Declarative User Interface: using an XML format, the new feature known as UiBinder allows the creation of user interfaces through declaration rather than code. This allows a clean separation of UI construction and behavior implementation.
- Resource bundling: the ClientBundle interface will allow resources of any nature (images, CSS, text, binary) to be bundled together and transferred in one download, resulting in fewer round-trips to the server and hence lower application latency.

Since the new development mode removed most platform-specific code, the new version will be distributed as a unique archive, instead of one per supported platform, as was the case with previous versions.

== Mobile ==
As a general framework for making web apps, Google Web Toolkit is also capable of being used as a framework for creating mobile and tablet apps, either by making the needed widgets and animations from scratch or by using one of the mobile frameworks for GWT. An HTML5 app written in GWT can have separate views for Tablets and Mobile phones.

== See also ==
- Dart (programming language)
- Google Plugin for Eclipse
- Google Code
- Comparison of JavaScript-based web frameworks
- Comparison of web frameworks
- Emscripten for converting C++ into JavaScript or WebAssembly
- RAS syndrome

== Bibliography ==
- Dewsbury, Ryan (December 15, 2007). Google Web Toolkit Applications. Prentice Hall. p. 608. ISBN 978-0-321-50196-7.
- Chaganti, Prabhakar (February 15, 2007). Google Web Toolkit: GWT Java Ajax Programming. Packt Publishing. p. 248. ISBN 978-1-84719-100-7. Archived from the original on April 30, 2011.
- Geary, David (November 17, 2007). Google Web Toolkit Solutions: More Cool & Useful Stuff. Prentice Hall. p. 408. ISBN 978-0-13-234481-4.
- Hanson, Robert; Adam Tacy (February 7, 2013). GWT in Action (2nd ed.). Manning. p. 643. ISBN 978-1-935182-84-9.
- Cooper, Robert; Charlie Collins (May 12, 2008). GWT in Practice. Manning. p. 376. ISBN 978-1-933988-29-0.
