= Vaadin =

Web development platform written in Java

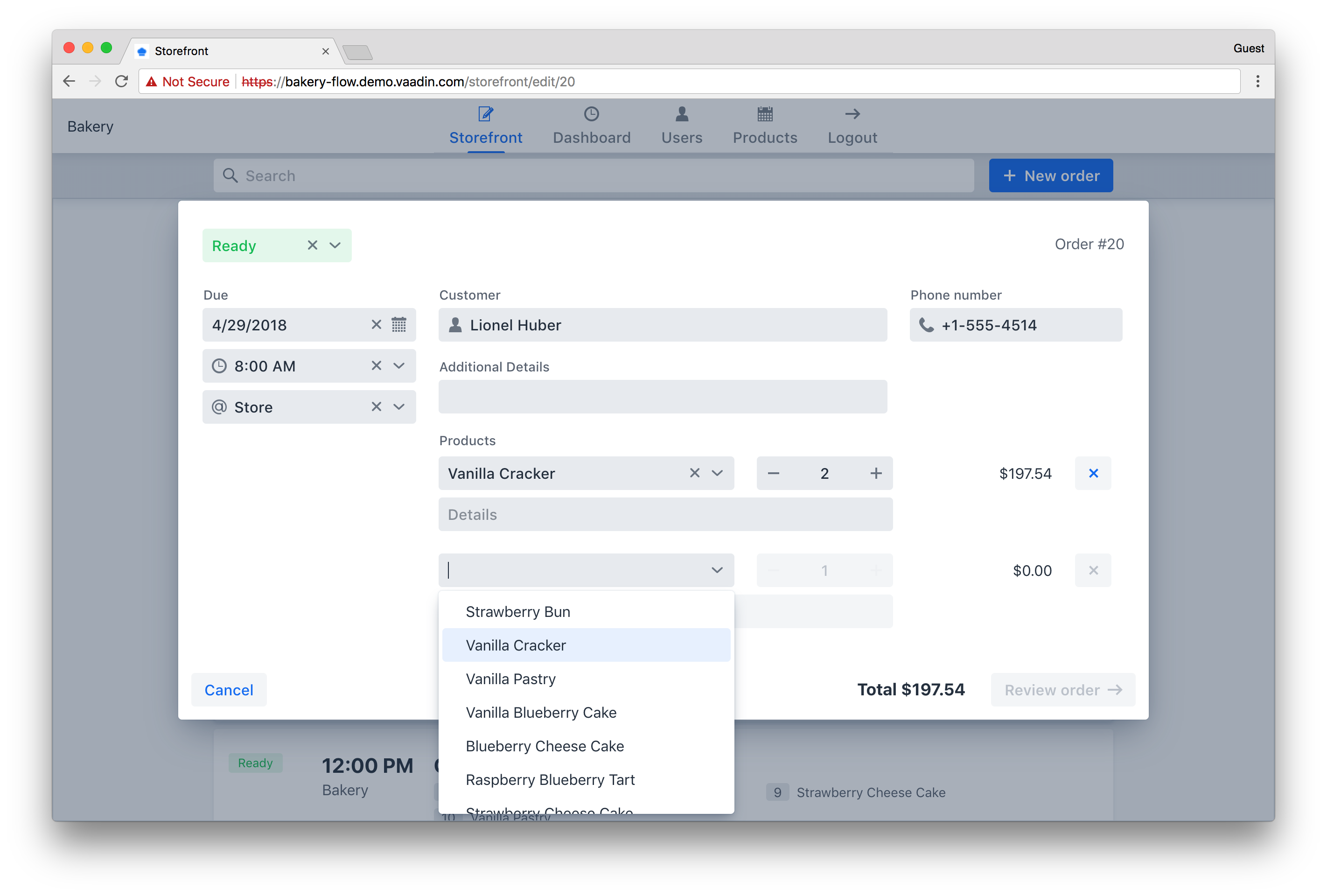
- Web application implemented with Vaadin Flow
- Developer: Vaadin Ltd.
- Stable release: 25.3.0 (September 23, 2026; 11 days ago) [±] 24.10.10 (Java 17 support, commercial release) (September 10, 2026; 24 days ago) [±] 23.6.15 (Java 11 support, commercial release) (September 23, 2026; 11 days ago) [±] 14.14.6 (Java 8 support, commercial release) (September 9, 2026; 25 days ago) [±]
- Written in: Java, JavaScript
- Platform: Cross platform
- Type: Web framework
- License: Apache License 2.0
- Website: vaadin.com
- Repository: Vaadin Repository

Vaadin (Finnish pronunciation: [ˈʋɑːdin]) is an open-source web application development platform for Java. Vaadin includes a set of Web Components, a Java web framework, and a set of tools that enable developers to implement modern web graphical user interfaces (GUI) using the Java programming language only (instead of HTML and JavaScript), TypeScript only, or a combination of both.

== History ==
Development began as the Millstone web framework in 2000. It was first released as open-source in 2002. Millstone introduced a component-oriented programming model for the web and an Ajax-based client communication and rendering engine. As a result, a large part of Vaadin's server-side API remains compatible with Millstone's Swing-like APIs.

In early 2007 the product name was changed to IT Mill Toolkit and version 4 was released. It used a proprietary JavaScript Ajax-implementation for the client-side rendering, which made it rather complicated to implement new widgets. By the end of the year 2007 the proprietary client-side implementation was abandoned and GWT was integrated on top of the server-side components. At the same time, the product license was changed to the open source Apache License 2.0. The first production-ready release of IT Mill Toolkit 5 was made on March 4, 2009, after an over one year beta period.

On September 11, 2008, it was publicly announced that Michael Widenius–the main author of the original version of MySQL–invested in IT Mill, the Finnish developer of Vaadin. The size of the investment is undisclosed.

On May 20, 2009, IT Mill Toolkit changed its name to Vaadin Framework. The name originates from the Finnish word for doe, more precisely put, a female reindeer. It can also be translated from Finnish as "I insist". In addition to the name change, a pre-release of version 6 along with a community website was launched. Later, IT Mill Ltd, the company behind the open source Vaadin Framework, changed its name to Vaadin Ltd.

On March 30, 2010, Vaadin Directory was opened. It added a channel for distributing add-on components to the core Vaadin Framework, both for free or commercially. On launch date, there were 95 add-ons already available for download.

Release history
LTS Version	Release date	Notes and new features since the previous LTS version launch
6	20 May 2009	Initial release
7	3 February 2013	
8	21 February 2017	Improvements include a re-written data binding API that uses modern Java features such as type parameters and lambda expressions, and more efficient memory and CPU usage.
10	25 June 2018	It's possible to use Vaadin's UI components from any technology compatible with Web Components. Vaadin Directory adds Web Components distribution. Vaadin Flow—the next generation of Vaadin Framework—was presented as a server-side Java web framework on top of Vaadin's UI components.
14	14 August 2019	New UI components, CDI and OSGi support, Gradle integration, dynamic registration of routes, keyboard shortcuts API, support for npm and Bower.
23	1 March 2022	New release model. New UI components, reworked design system, feature flags, npm is now the default package manager.
24	8 March 2023	Java 17 baseline along with Spring Boot 3 and Jakarta EE 10. The free version no longer supports Polymer templates, and Lit-templateshave been introduced as a replacement.
25	17 December 2025	Java 21 baseline along with Spring Boot 4 and Jakarta EE 11. New Aura theme, Tailwind CSS support, improved React integration, and development time tooling in Vaadin Copilot.

== Vaadin Flow (Java API) ==
Vaadin Flow (formerly Vaadin Framework) is a Java web framework for building web applications and websites. Vaadin Flow's programming model allows developers to use Java as the programming language for implementing User Interfaces (UIs) without having to directly use HTML or JavaScript. Vaadin Flow features a server-side architecture which means that most of the UI logic runs securely on the server reducing the exposure to attackers. On the client-side, Vaadin Flow is built on top of Web Component standards. The client/server communication is automatically handled through WebSocket or HTTP with light JSON messages that update both, the UI in the browser and the UI state in the server.

Vaadin Flow's Java API includes classes such as TextField, Button, ComboBox, Grid, and many others that can be configured, styled, and added into layout objects instances of classes such as VerticalLayout, HorizontalLayout, SplitLayout, and others. Behaviour is implemented by adding listeners to events such as clicks, input value changes, and others. Views are created by custom Java classes that implement another UI component (custom or provided by the framework). This view classes are annotated with @Route to expose them to the browser with a specific URL. The following example illustrates these concepts:

@Route("hello-world") // exposes the view through http://localhost:8080/hello-world
public class MainView extends VerticalLayout { // extends an existing UI component

    public MainView() {
        // creates a text field
        TextField textField = new TextField("Enter your name");

        // creates a button
        Button button = new Button("Send");
        
        // adds behaviour to the button using the click event
        button.addClickListener(event ->
                add(new Paragraph("Hello, " + textField.getValue()))
        );

        // adds the UI components to the view (VerticalLayout)
        add(textField, button);
    }
}

The following is a screenshot of the previous example:

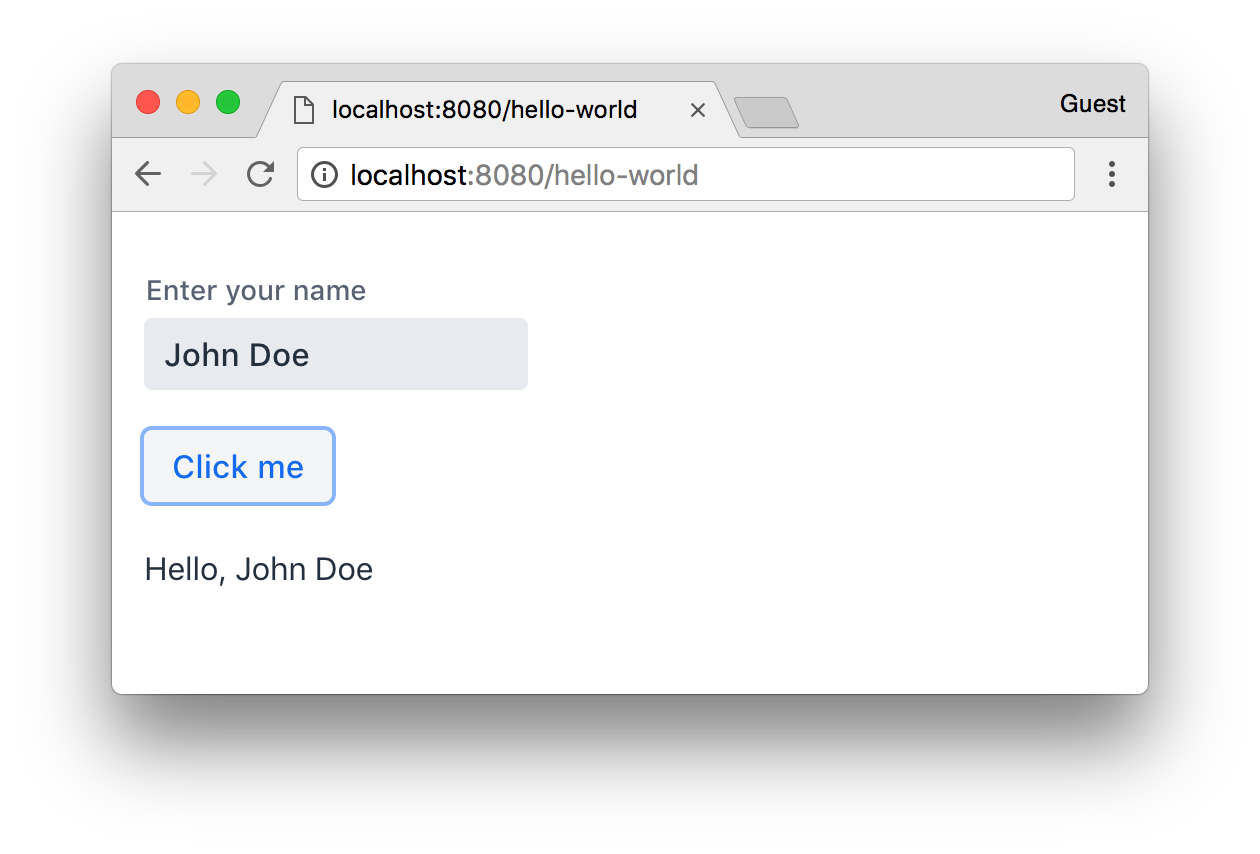

== Hilla (TypeScript API) ==
Hilla (formerly Vaadin Fusion) is a web framework that integrates Spring Boot Java backends with reactive front ends implemented in TypeScript. This combination offers a fully type-safe development platform by combining server-side business logic in Java and type-safety in the client side with the TypeScript programming language. Views are implemented using Lit—a lightweight library for creating Web Components. The following is an example of a basic view implemented with Hilla:

@customElement('hello-world-view')
export class HelloWorldView extends LitElement {
  render() {
    return html`
      <div>
        <vaadin-text-field label="Your name"></vaadin-text-field>
        <vaadin-button @click="${this.sayHello}">Say hello</vaadin-button>
      </div>
    `;
  }

  sayHello() {
    showNotification('Hello!');
  }
}

Starting in October 2025, Hilla is being discontinued as a stand-alone product and merged into Flow.

== Vaadin's UI components ==
Vaadin includes a set of User Interface (UI) components implemented as Web Components. These components include a server-side Java API (Vaadin Flow) but can also be used directly in HTML documents as well. Vaadin's UI components work with mouse and touch events, can be customized with CSS, are compatible with WAI-ARIA, include keyboard and screen readers support, and support right-to-left languages.

The following table shows a list of the UI components included in Vaadin:

Vaadin components
Java class	HTML element name	Description	License
Accordion	vaadin-accordion	A vertically stacked set of expandable panels	Apache 2.0
Anchor	a	Allows navigation to a given URL	Apache 2.0
AppLayout	vaadin-app-layout	A common application layout structure	Apache 2.0
Avatar	vaadin-avatar	A graphical representation of a person	Apache 2.0
(not available)	vaadin-badge	A coloured text element for labelling content	Apache 2.0
Board	vaadin-board-row	Layout component for building responsive views	Commercial
Button	vaadin-button	Allows users to perform actions	Apache 2.0
Crud	vaadin-crud	A component to manage Create, Read, Update, and Delete operations	Commercial
Chart	vaadin-chart	Interactive charts with different types such as bar, pie, line, and others	Commercial
Checkbox	vaadin-checkbox	An input field representing a binary choice	Apache 2.0
Combo box	vaadin-combo-box	Shows a list of items that can be filtered	Apache 2.0
ConfirmDialog	vaadin-confirm-dialog	A modal Dialog used to confirm user actions	Apache 2.0
ContextMenu	vaadin-context-menu	A menu that appears on right-click or long touch press	Apache 2.0
CookieConsent	vaadin-cookie-consent	A banner that to comply with privacy laws such as GDPR and CCPA	Commercial
CustomField	vaadin-custom-field	A component for wrapping multiple components as a single field	Apache 2.0
DatePicker	vaadin-date-picker	Allows to enter a date by typing or by selecting from a calendar overlay	Apache 2.0
DateTimePicker	vaadin-date-time-picker	An input field for selecting both a date and a time	Apache 2.0
Details	vaadin-details	An expandable panel for showing and hiding content	Apache 2.0
Dialog	vaadin-dialog	A popup window to show other components in an overlay	Apache 2.0
EmailField	vaadin-email-field	A text field that only accepts email addresses as input	Apache 2.0
Form layout	vaadin-form-layout	A layout for building responsive forms with multiple columns	Apache 2.0
Grid	vaadin-grid	Data grid or data table component for tabular data	Apache 2.0
GridPro	vaadin-grid-pro	Provides inline editing with full keyboard navigation	Commercial
HorizontalLayout	vaadin-horizontal-layout	Places components side-by-side in a row	Apache 2.0
Icon	vaadin-icon	Shows a custom icon or from a collection of 600+ icons (VaadinIcons enum)	Apache 2.0
Image	img	Shows an image from a resource file or from binary data generated at runtime	Apache 2.0
ListBox	vaadin-list-box	Allows to select one or more values from a scrollable list of items	Apache 2.0
LoginForm	vaadin-login-form	A component that contains a login form	Apache 2.0
LoginOverlay	vaadin-login-overlay	A modal or full-screen login form	Apache 2.0
MenuBar	vaadin-menu-bar	A horizontal button bar with hierarchical drop-down menus	Apache 2.0
MessageList	vaadin-message-list	A component for displaying messages and building chats and comment sections	Apache 2.0
Notification	vaadin-notification	Overlay component used to provide feedback to the user	Apache 2.0
NumberField	vaadin-number-field	A text field that only accepts numeric input (decimal, integral, or big decimal)	Apache 2.0
PasswordField	vaadin-password-field	An input field for entering passwords masked by default	Apache 2.0
ProgressBar	vaadin-progress-bar	Shows the completion status of a task or process	Apache 2.0
Radio button	vaadin-radio-button	Allows to select exactly one value from a list of related but mutually exclusive options	Apache 2.0
RichTextEditor	vaadin-rich-text-editor	An input field for entering rich text	Commercial
Scroller	vaadin-scroller	A component container for creating scrollable areas in the UI	Apache 2.0
Select	vaadin-select	An input field component for choosing a single value from a set of options	Apache 2.0
SplitLayout	vaadin-split-layout	A component with two content areas and a draggable split handle between them	Apache 2.0
Tabs	vaadin-tabs	Organize and group content into sections	Apache 2.0
TextArea	vaadin-text-area	An input field component for multi-line text input	Apache 2.0
TextField	vaadin-text-field	A component for introducing and editing text	Apache 2.0
TimePicker	vaadin-time-picker	An input field for entering or selecting a specific time	Apache 2.0
TreeGrid	vaadin-grid	A component for displaying hierarchical tabular data grouped into expandable and collapsible nodes	Apache 2.0
Upload	vaadin-upload	A component for uploading one or more files with upload progress and status	Apache 2.0
VerticalLayout	vaadin-vertical-layout	Places components top-to-bottom in a column	Apache 2.0

== Vaadin Copilot ==
Vaadin Copilot is a browser-based development tool that runs inside a Vaadin application during development. It provides visual drag-and-drop editing of UI layouts, AI-assisted code generation, Figma-to-code import, accessibility checking, and UI test generation directly within the running application.

Copilot operates through a toolbar with four working modes: Play (normal application interaction), Inspect (read-only structure exploration), Test (accessibility and UI test generation), and Edit (drag-and-drop layout changes and AI-powered code modifications).

Starting with Vaadin 25.1, all Copilot features—including source code manipulation and AI assistance—are available at no cost to any developer with a Vaadin.com account. IDE integrations are available for IntelliJ IDEA, Visual Studio Code, and Eclipse.

== Certifications ==
Vaadin offers certification tracks to prove that a developer is proficient with Vaadin Flow:

- Certified Vaadin 25 Developer

To pass the certification, a developer should go through the documentation, follow the training videos, and take an online test.

Previous (now unavailable) certifications included:

- Vaadin Online Exam for Vaadin 7 Certified Developer
- Vaadin Online Exam for Vaadin 8 Certified Developer
- Certified Vaadin 14 Developer
- Certified Vaadin 14 Professional

== Vaadin Enterprise Edition ==
Vaadin Enterprise Edition is a commercially licensed distribution of Vaadin that provides additional guarantees and tools aimed at organisations deploying long-lived, regulated, or security-sensitive applications.

The primary technical differentiator is extended long-term support (LTS): Enterprise subscribers receive security fixes and maintenance patches for 15 years from the release of the next major version, covering periods that routinely extend to 15–18 years from the initial release. CVE notifications are provided to subscribers before public disclosure, and security fixes are delivered ahead of the open-source release. Annual third-party audits produce an Accessibility Conformance Report (ACR/VPAT) covering WCAG 2.1 AA, Section 508, and EN 301 549.

== See also ==
- List of rich web application frameworks
