= Mish (disambiguation) =

Mish (Arabic: مش) is a traditional Egyptian cheese made from another cheese from yogurt.

Mish may also refer to:

== People ==
=== Given named or nicknamed ===
- Mish Barber-Way (born 1985), Canadian singer
- Mish Cowan (born 1982), Australian Aussie-rules-football coach
- Mish Michaels (1968–2022), U.S. broadcast meteorologist

=== Surnamed ===
- Henry Mish, namesake of the Henry Mish Barn
- Jeanetta Calhoun Mish (born 1961), U.S. poet

=== Fictional characters ===
- Mish Mash, a fictional character from The Brave Little Toaster

== Places ==
- Henry Mish Barn (Mish barn), Augusta County, Virginia, USA; a historic barn
- Mish House, San Francisco, California, USA

== Other uses ==
- "The Mish", a 1998 song by Che Fu off the album 2b S.Pacific
- Mish function
- Mish, slang term for the missionary position

== See also ==
- MishCatt, Costa Rican singer
- Mich (disambiguation)
- Mishmish (disambiguation)
- Mish Mash (disambiguation)
- Mash (disambiguation)
