= Mash =

Mash, MASH, or M*A*S*H may refer to:

== Arts, entertainment, and media ==
- M*A*S*H, an American media franchise
  - MASH: A Novel About Three Army Doctors (Mobile Army Surgical Hospital), 1968, by Richard Hooker
  - M*A*S*H (film), 1970 American black comedy war film
  - M*A*S*H (TV series) (1972–1983), American war comedy drama TV series
  - List of M*A*S*H novels
- Mash Burnedead, the main character of the manga series Mashle

== Foods and beverages ==
- Mashing and heating grains with water
- Mash ingredients, to make alcoholic beverages
- Mashed potato (English colloquialism: mash)

== People ==
- Deborah Mash, American professor of neurology
- Lloyd Mash (born 1981), Australian cricketer
- Matt Mervis ("Mash"; b. 1998), American baseball player
- Mashrafe Mortaza ("Mash"), Bangladeshi cricketer and politician

== Mathematics and technology ==
- MASH (modulator) (Multi-stAge noise SHaping), a signal-processing technology commonly used for digital audio reproduction
- MASH-1 and MASH-2, a hash function
- Yahoo! Mash, a social network service

== Medicine ==
- Metabolic dysfunction–associated steatohepatitis, formerly NASH

== Other uses ==
- Mobile Army Surgical Hospital, of US Army
- Mash (biblical figure), in the book of Genesis
- Mash (online newspaper), Russia
- MASH (game), a paper-and-pencil game
- Mash (restaurant chain), steakhouses in Denmark and Germany
- Mashramani ("Mash"), a Guyanese festival
- Multi-Agency Safeguarding Hub ("MASH"), collaborative arrangements in the UK for coordinate safeguarding work

== See also ==
- Mashable, a Scottish-American website
- Mashup (disambiguation)
- Mashed (disambiguation)
- Masher (disambiguation)
- Mish Mash (disambiguation)
- Mesh (disambiguation)
