= Mashup =

Mashup may refer to:

- Mashup (culture), the rearrangement of spliced parts of musical pieces as part of a subculture
- Mashup (education), combining various forms of data and media by a teacher or student in an instructional setting
- Mashup (music), a song or composition created by blending two or more pre-recorded songs
- Mashup (video), a video that is edited from multiple sources to appear unified
- Mashup novel, a type of fiction combining pre-existing literature with other genres to create a single narrative
- Mashup (web application hybrid), a web application that combines content from more than one source in a single graphical interface
- "Mash-Up" (Glee), the eighth episode of the American television series Glee, first aired in 2009
- Mash Up (TV series), a 2012 American television show on Comedy Central starring T.J. Miller

== See also ==
- Band Mashups, the former name of the video game Battle of the Bands
- Google Mashup Editor
- Lotus Mashups, a business mashups editor
- Quodlibet
- Mash (disambiguation)
- Mashed (disambiguation)
- Masher (disambiguation)
- Mish Mash (disambiguation)
