= Mishmish =

Mishmish, Mish Mish, or variation, may refer to:

- Egyptian Communist Organisation, known by the Arabic acronym Mishmish
- Mujahideen Shura Council (Syria), known by the Arabic acronym Mishmish
- Mish Mish, Akkar, Lebanon
- Mish Mish, Byblos, Lebanon
- Mish Mish (restaurant), in Philadelphia

== See also ==
- Mishmish Effenfi, a cartoon created by the Frenkel brothers
- Mish (disambiguation)
- Mich Mich (disambiguation)
- Mish Mash (disambiguation)
