= Mich Mich =

Mich Mich or Michmich may refer to:

- Mich-Mich, a fictional character from Speed Racer
- Mish Mish, Akkar District, Akkar Governorate, Lebanon (Arabic: مشمش, romanized: Michmich; also spelled Mich Mich)
- Mish Mish, Byblos District, Keserwan-Jbeil Governorate, Lebanon (Arabic: مشمش, romanized: Michmich; also spelled Mich Mich)

== See also ==
- Mich (disambiguation)
- Mishmish (disambiguation)
- Mish Mash (disambiguation)
