= Hurricane Mitch (disambiguation) =

Hurricane Mitch was a 1998 Category 5 Atlantic hurricane.

Hurricane Mitch may also refer to:

- Meteorological history of Hurricane Mitch, the synoptic history of the 1998 Atlantic hurricane
- Hurricane Mitch Victims National Monument, a protected area in Nicaragua

== See also ==
- List of storms named Mitchell
- Mitch (disambiguation)
