= Mashed =

Mashed may refer to:

- Mashed, that created from mash ingredients
- Mashed, the result of a mashing
- Mashed, the result of a mashup (music)
- Mashed (album), a 2007 mashup album
- Mashed (video game), a vehicular combat video game
- Mashed.com, a food website owned by Static Media

== See also ==
- Mashed potato (disambiguation)
- Mashable
- Mashup (disambiguation)
- Masher (disambiguation)
- Mash (disambiguation)
- Mish Mash (disambiguation)
