= Francis Cardenau =

Chef and restaurateur

Francis Cardenau (born 1957) is a Denmark-based French chef and restaurateur. He achieved two Michelin stars as head chef at restaurant Kommandanten in Copenhagen and was a co-founder of the restaurant chain MASH.

== Biography ==
Cardenau was born and raised in Lourdes. He was educated as a chef north of Paris. He moved to Copenhagen in the 1990s where he achieved two stars in the Guide Michelin in 1997. In 1997, together with Jesper Boelsskifte and Erik Gemal, he founded Le Sommelier and left Kommandanten in 1999 to work full-time as head chef at the restaurant. In May 2005, Cardenau, Boelsskifte and Gemal opened French-Japanese restaurant Umami. In 2009, they opened the first MASH steak house. In January 2017, it was announced that he had sold his share of the company.

== Personal life ==
Francis Cardenau lives with his Danish wife, Henriette Bych Cardenau, on a small farm close to Hillerød in North Zealand
