= Mich =

Mich or MICH may refer to:

== People ==
- An abbreviation for Michelle (name)
- Mich Dulce (born 1981), Filipina fashion designer, milliner, corsetiere, feminist activist, actress, artist and singer
- Mich Matsudaira (1937–2019), American businessman and civil rights activist
- Vigilio Mich (1931–2019), Italian cross-country skier who competed in the 1956 Olympics

== Places ==
- Mich, Narmashir, Iran, a village
- Mich., an abbreviation for the U.S. state of Michigan

== Other uses ==
- Modular Integrated Communications Helmet (MICH), an American combat helmet

== See also ==
- Mich Mich (disambiguation)
- Mitch (disambiguation)
- Mitchell (disambiguation)
- Michelle (disambiguation)
- Michigan (disambiguation)
- Mish (disambiguation)
