= Masher =

The term masher may refer to one of the following:

- A cooking utensil (i.e. Potato masher)
- A man who makes unwelcome advances, often in public places and typically to women he does not know
- A term for a dandy
- A computer device used to create a Compact Disc (i.e. Disk Masher System)
- A Model 24 grenade
- A member of the Mashed Moama Cup, which is an annual amateur golf trip held in Melbourne Australia that commenced in 2001.

== See also ==
- Mash (disambiguation)
- Mashup (disambiguation)
- Mashed (disambiguation)
- Mish Mash (disambiguation)
