= Mish Mash =

Mishmash is a confused or disorderly mixture of things, a hodgepodge.

Mishmash or mish mash may also refer to:

- Mish-mash (food), a Bulgarian dish
- Mish Mash, a 1997 album by English dub band Rockers Hi-Fi
- Mish Mash!, a 2004 rock album by Regurgitator
- Mish Mash (band), a UK electronic dance music group
- Mish-Mash, a fictional character from The Brave Little Toaster

== See also ==
- Mischmasch, a periodical written by Lewis Carroll
- Michmash, a Biblical town
- Mish (disambiguation)
- Mash (disambiguation)
- Mashed (disambiguation)
- Masher (disambiguation)
- Mashup (disambiguation)
- Mich Mich (disambiguation)
- Mishmish (disambiguation)
