= Mitch (disambiguation) =

Mitch is a masculine given name.

Mitch may also refer to:

- "Mitch" (song), debut single by Paul Heaton
- Mitch (TV series), a 1984 British crime drama starring John Thaw

== See also ==
- Mich (disambiguation)
- Hurricane Mitch (disambiguation)
