= Plural policing =

Plural policing is a term that describes the idea that the police cannot work on their own as the sole agency to deal with the wide range of issues that they are expected to deal with in the present day. It draws on the idea of a mixed economy and so is also sometimes referred to as mixed economy policing. Plural policing relates to the wide range of other agencies, both public, private, and charity that work towards the generic aim of law enforcement. The idea of plural policing was first considered in an article by Les Johnson in 1993 entitled "Privatisation and Protection: Spatial and Sectoral Ideologies in British Policing and Crime Prevention" in the Modern Law Review. Ten years later, he expanded on this initial work in a further article.

== Definition ==
There are several different forms that the idea of plural policing and the extended police family can take, as outlined by Ian Loader. He names these as

- By the government — consisting of traditional public police forces
- Through the government — through the awarding of public sector contracts to private companies such as G4S or GEOAmey as in the UK with the 2012 Summer Olympics
- Above the government — international security and policing arrangements such as Interpol
- Beyond the government — private companies undertaking private security arrangements, such as campus police in the US or licensed premises security through the Security Industry Authority in the UK. It can also include private policing initiatives such as My Local Bobby
- Below the government — private citizens undertaking law enforcement activities such as neighborhood watch schemes

== Plural policing in the United Kingdom ==
Within the United Kingdom, plural policing can also refer to the extended police family. The history of plural policing in the UK can be traced back to the work of Athelstan Popkess who in 1959 proposed the idea of "a body of men, eager for police work, but barred by height or age to deal with trifling motoring offences like illegal parking and obstruction" to the Home Secretary Ernest Marples and his professional colleagues. This led to the creation of Traffic Wardens, the first public-facing civilian role in policing.

Law enforcement in the United Kingdom extended family can include civilians who form part of the modern landscape of policing, such as civilian detention officers and police community support officers; roles created under the Police Reform Act 2002, intended to free up the time of warranted constables. It can also include the Special Constabulary volunteer officers with the same powers as regular police officers and non-Home Office (special police) forces such as the British Transport Police, Ministry of Defence Police, and the Civil Nuclear Constabulary. It can also include national crime fighting organisations such as the National Crime Agency and Regional Organised Crime Units, as well as national intelligence co-ordination agencies such as National Fraud Intelligence Bureau and National Vehicle Crime Intelligence Service.

=== Multi-Agency Safeguarding Hubs ===
The plurality of policing is perhaps best exemplified by the idea of the Multi-Agency Safeguarding Hubs (MASH). These are dedicated permanent multi-agency co-operatives where professionals from agencies such as social care, National Probation Service, Women's Aid, education authorities, social housing providers, and Independent Domestic Violence Advisors all work together in the same office; all with the aim of safeguarding vulnerable adults and children. This allows for the most effective and instantaneous information sharing, all with the intention of preventing and reducing future harm to higher risk victims.

=== Community policing ===
Community policing is another area where plural policing can be seen. PCSO's are deployed as part of the extended policing family to interact with the communities they serve in an effort to increase police legitimacy and also gather police intelligence. Special constables are also commonly deployed on community related activities to provide additional resources. Outside of the police, private and charity agencies also participate heavily in community policing; whether it is university or hospital security teams working with the police to reduce crime and disorder within their establishments, or neighbourhood watch schemes or Crimestoppers UK helping to combat local criminality.

=== Events ===
Private large events such as music festivals, sporting events or beer festivals are examples of activities who are expected to provide their own extensive security arrangements; commonly using private companies. Quite often these events will also have a police presence, but this is significantly smaller than may be expected as the private security firms take primacy, with the police officers only dealing with more serious criminality that can't be handled by the private security.

=== Terrorism ===
Under the government's CONTEST strategy to combat terrorism, particularly the PREVENT strand, the police are expected to work with other law enforcement and intelligence bodies such as the Joint Terrorism Analysis Centre, MI5, MI6, and the National Crime Agency, as well as non-traditional partners such as schools, universities, community groups, youth groups, and faith groups to identify people at risk of radicalisation. The outside agencies are required to refer those they suspect of developing extreme views to the programme so that the government agencies can attempt to de-radicalise them in order to prevent terrorist attacks.
