= Meteorological history of Hurricane Mitch =

Hurricane Mitch
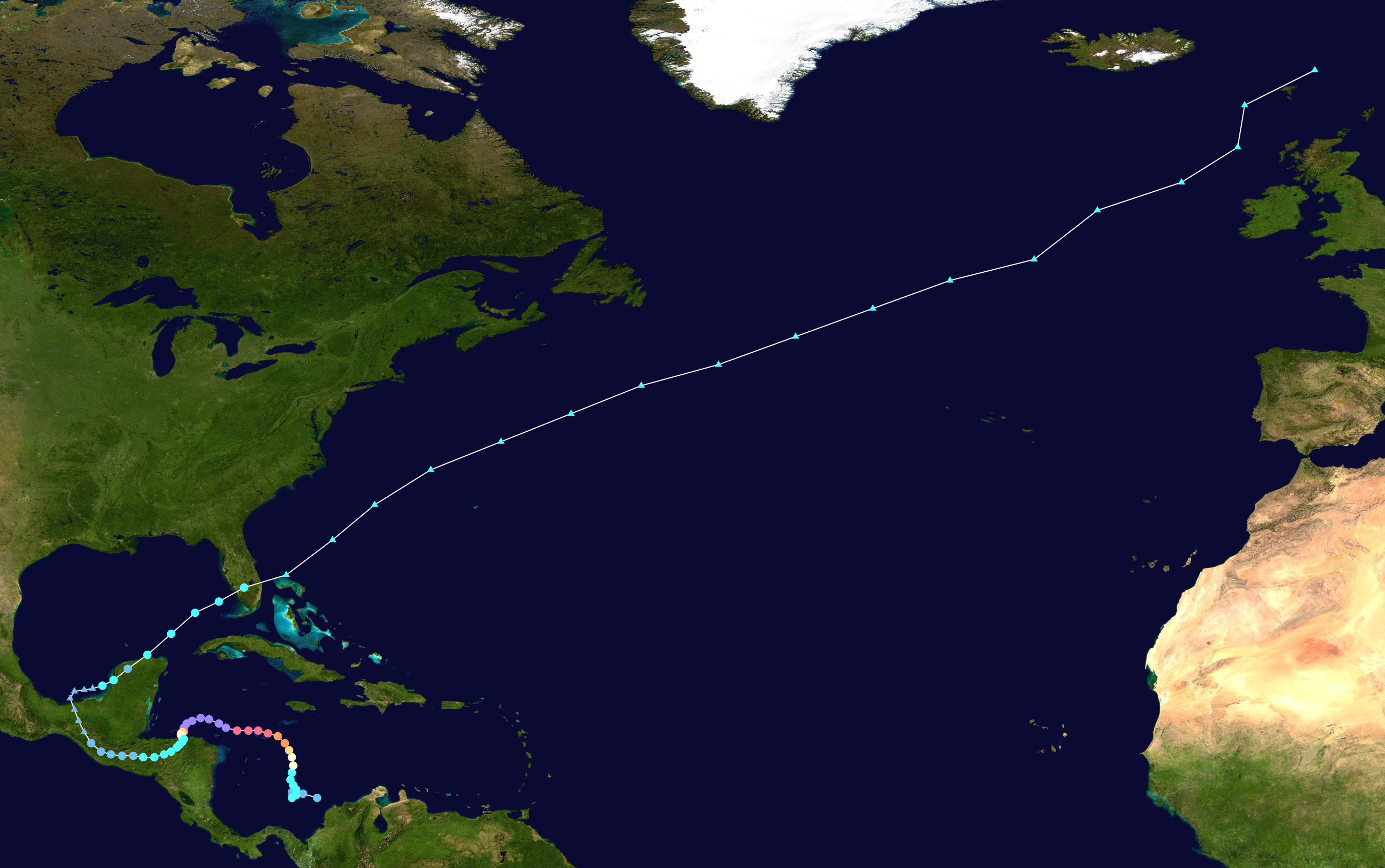
- Track of Hurricane Mitch

Meteorological history
- Formed: October 22, 1998
- Extratropical: November 5
- Dissipated: November 9, 1998

Category 5 major hurricane
- 1-minute sustained (SSHWS/NWS)
- Highest winds: 180 mph (285 km/h)
- Lowest pressure: 905 mbar (hPa); 26.72 inHg

Overall effects
- Areas affected: Central America (particularly Honduras and Nicaragua), Yucatán Peninsula, South Florida
- Part of the 1998 Atlantic hurricane season

Hurricane Mitch's meteorological history began with its origins over Africa as a tropical wave and lasted until its dissipation as an extratropical cyclone north of the United Kingdom. Tropical Depression Thirteen formed on October 22, 1998, over the southwestern Caribbean Sea from a tropical wave that exited Africa on October 10. It executed a small loop, and while doing so intensified into Tropical Storm Mitch. A weakness in a ridge allowed the storm to track slowly to the north. After becoming disorganized due to wind shear from a nearby upper-level low, Mitch quickly intensified in response to improving conditions which included warm waters and good outflow. It became a hurricane on October 24 and developed an eye. After turning to the west, Mitch rapidly intensified, first into a major hurricane on October 25 and then into a Category 5 on the Saffir-Simpson Hurricane Scale the next day.

At peak intensity, Mitch maintained maximum sustained winds of 180 mph (285 km/h) while off the northern coast of Honduras. Hurricane Hunters reported a minimum barometric pressure of 905 mbar (26.7 inHg), which at the time was the lowest in the month of October and tied for the fourth lowest for any Atlantic hurricane. Initially, the National Hurricane Center (NHC) and various tropical cyclone forecast models anticipated a turn to the north, threatening the Yucatán Peninsula. Instead, Mitch turned to the south due to a ridge that was not observed while the storm was active. Land interaction imparted weakening, and the hurricane made landfall on Honduras on October 29 with winds of 80 mph (130 km/h). Turning westward, Mitch slowly weakened over land and maintained deep convection over adjacent waters. After moving across mountainous terrain in Central America, the surface circulation of Mitch dissipated on November 1. The next day, the remnants reached the Gulf of Mexico and reorganized into a tropical storm on November 3. Mitch accelerated to the northeast ahead of a cold front, moving across the Yucatán Peninsula before striking southwestern Florida on November 5. Shortly thereafter, the storm became an extratropical cyclone, which was tracked by the NHC until November 9.

== Origins ==
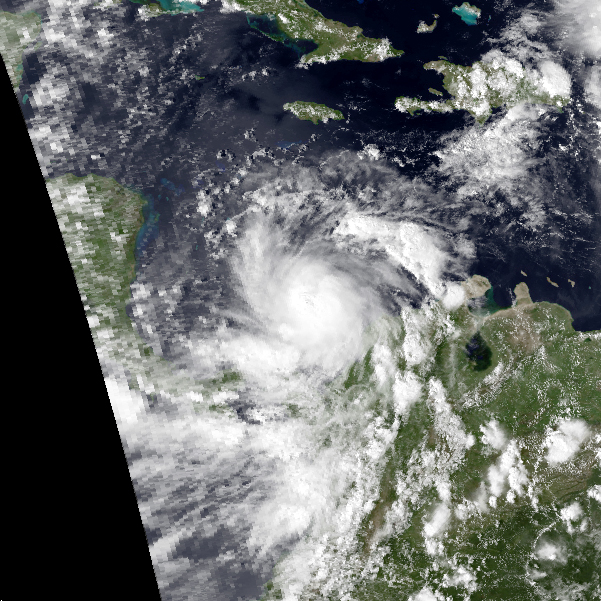
Tropical Storm Mitch shortly after forming

The origin of Hurricane Mitch can be traced to a tropical wave – an elongated area of low air pressure moving from east to west – that moved through western Africa on October 8, as evidenced by radiosonde data. On October 10, the wave exited the coast, and it continued generally westward without development due to strong wind shear. The wave reached the eastern Caribbean Sea on October 18, and over the subsequent few days developed an organizing area of convection, or thunderstorms. The system organized enough to prompt a Hurricane Hunters investigation, which observed a small circulation center and flight-level tropical storm force winds. As a result, the National Hurricane Center (NHC) estimated the system had developed into a tropical cyclone by 0000 UTC on October 22, located 415 mi (665 km) south of Kingston, Jamaica.

Upon being classified, Tropical Depression Thirteen was already near tropical storm status, with established outflow. At the time, the circulation was on the northern periphery of the convection. Initially, an upper-level low to the north was shearing the convection, but steady intensification was expected due to generally favorable conditions, with an anticyclone expected to develop aloft. The depression remained nearly stationary in the southwestern Caribbean Sea, eventually executing a small loop about 260 mi (420 km) east of San Andrés island. The convective structure initially was described as "amorphous", with two rainbands extending from the center. Late on October 22, the Hurricane Hunters observed flight-level winds of 59 mph (95 km/h), which indicated surface winds of at least tropical storm-force. Based on the reading, the NHC upgraded the depression to Tropical Storm Mitch.

== Intensification ==
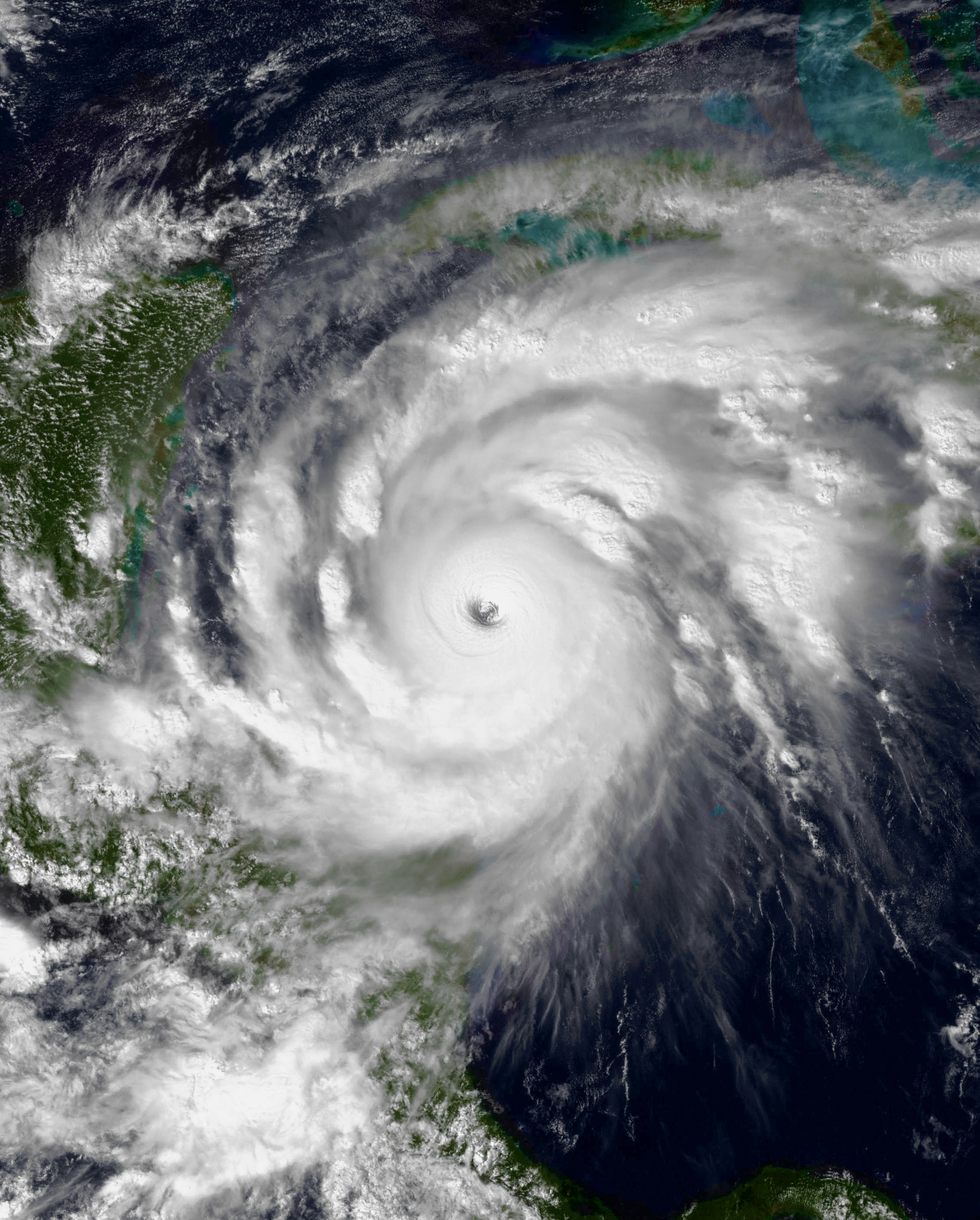
Mitch shortly after peak intensity while north of Honduras on October 26

When Mitch was upgraded to tropical storm status, it had a small radius of maximum winds, only 9 mi (14 km) at flight-level. A trough moving through the eastern United States weakened a ridge to the north, allowing the storm to move slowly northward. Additional ridging was forecast to build behind the trough, which would turn Mitch to the west to an area near the Yucatán Channel in five days. Significant intensification was initially hampered by the upper-level low to the northwest generating wind shear over Mitch. As a result, the convection weakened on October 23, despite an otherwise improving cloud pattern. Tropical cyclone forecast models anticipated significant strengthening to winds of 115 mph (185 km/h) once an anticyclone aloft became established, although the NHC noted that "it [was] difficult to visualize such intensification with the present poorly defined pattern observed on satellite, and knowing that the global models tend to get rid of westerlies too fast." After about 12 hours of being disorganized, the thunderstorms reformed early on October 24, after the upper-level low weakened and shear diminished. An eye quickly formed in the center of the convection. Based on Hurricane Hunter reports of 105 mph (169 km/h) flight-level winds, the NHC upgraded Mitch to hurricane status on October 24. By that time, the storm was moving slowly to the north, located about 295 mi (475 km) south of Kingston.

Shortly after becoming a hurricane, Mitch began undergoing rapid deepening. It developed a strong central dense overcast, fueled by low shear and warm water temperatures. The eye became better organized, and after the anticyclone became established, the hurricane developed well-defined outflow in all directions. Early on October 25, Mitch intensified into a major hurricane, which is a Category 3 on the Saffir-Simpson Hurricane Scale. By that time, the hurricane had begun turning to the west, due to an intensifying ridge over the Gulf of Mexico. With what the NHC described as an "ideal environment for strengthening", Mitch continued rapidly intensifying. In a 24‑hour period ending late on October 25, the barometric pressure fell 52 mbar (1.5 inHg) to 924 mbar (27.3 inHg). While it was strengthening, Mitch made its closest point of approach to Jamaica, passing about 230 mi (370 km) west-southwest of the island. The NHC noted the potential for weak steering currents when the hurricane reached the western Caribbean, and the agency anticipated a general northward turn toward the Yucatán Peninsula.

The NHC estimated that Mitch intensified into a Category 5 hurricane at 1200 UTC on October 26. At 1900 UTC that day, the Hurricane Hunters observed flight-level winds of 193 mph (311 km/h) in the hurricane's northeastern quadrant, suggesting peak maximum sustained winds of 180 mph (285 km/h). Around the same time, a dropsonde recorded a minimum pressure of 905 mbar (26.7 inHg). At the time, Mitch was considered the fourth most intense Atlantic hurricane, tied with Hurricane Camille in 1969, and the strongest in the month of October, surpassing Hurricane Hattie in 1961. Both records were surpassed by subsequent hurricanes. At the time, the hurricane was located about 100 mi (160 km) off the north coast of Honduras. Its tropical storm force winds extended 175 mi (280 km) from the center, and hurricane-force winds reached 60 mi (95 km) from the center.

== Central America landfall ==
Most intense Atlantic hurricanes
Rank	Hurricane	Season	Pressure	
Rank	Hurricane	Season	hPa	inHg
1	Wilma	2005	882	26.05
2	Gilbert	1988	888	26.23
3	"Labor Day"	1935	892	26.34
4	Rita	2005	895	26.43
4	Milton	2024	895	26.43
6	Allen	1980	899	26.55
7	Camille	1969	900	26.58
8	Katrina	2005	902	26.64
9	Mitch	1998	905	26.73
9	Dean	2007	905	26.73
Source: HURDAT

While Mitch was at peak intensity, the NHC noted that it was "not yet clear which country or countries in the northwest Caribbean are most threatened." By late on October 26, the Navy Operational Global Atmospheric Prediction System (NOGAPS) had forecast the hurricane to continue to the west and strike Belize, while the Geophysical Fluid Dynamics Laboratory (GFDL) computer model anticipated a general movement to the north in the western Caribbean. Mitch maintained peak winds for about 12 hours, and around that time it moved over Swan Island offshore Honduras. The motion became more westward, despite continued predictions for a northerly turn. The convection around the eye became ragged on October 27. Gradual weakening occurred due to the southern half of the circulation moving across Honduras, which cut off inflow from the south. The eye became less distinct, and early on October 28, Mitch weakened below Category 5 status.

Due to a weak mid-level anticyclone over the Gulf of Mexico that was not observed operationally, Mitch began a slow southerly motion on October 27, passing very near Guanaja. The NHC had anticipated the movement to be part of a small loop in the Gulf of Honduras, although the agency noted continued uncertainty. Steadily deteriorating, Mitch weakened below major hurricane intensity late on October 28, due to land interaction, upwelling, and possibly an eyewall replacement cycle. On October 29, the hurricane made landfall in Honduras, east of La Ceiba, with winds of 80 mph (130 km/h). Despite being over land, the NHC continued to predict a turn to the north, which would allow for restrengthening.

Late on October 29, Mitch weakened to tropical storm status. It moved slowly across Honduras, turning to the west. The large circulation dropped heavy rainfall throughout Central America, particularly in Honduras and Nicaragua, causing widespread flooding. While over land, Mitch initially maintained an area of deep convection, which allowed it to maintain tropical storm force winds. On October 31, the circulation became poorly defined while moving over increasingly mountainous terrain; however, the strongest convection persisted over the adjacent Pacific Ocean, and the NHC noted the potential for Mitch to become a Pacific tropical cyclone. Later that day, Mitch weakened into a tropical depression near the border of Guatemala and Honduras. An approaching trough weakened the ridge in the western Gulf of Mexico, allowing Mitch to make the long-intended turn to the northwest. Convection gradually diminished, and the surface circulation of Mitch dissipated on November 1 near the border of Mexico and Guatemala.

== Regeneration and extratropical transition ==
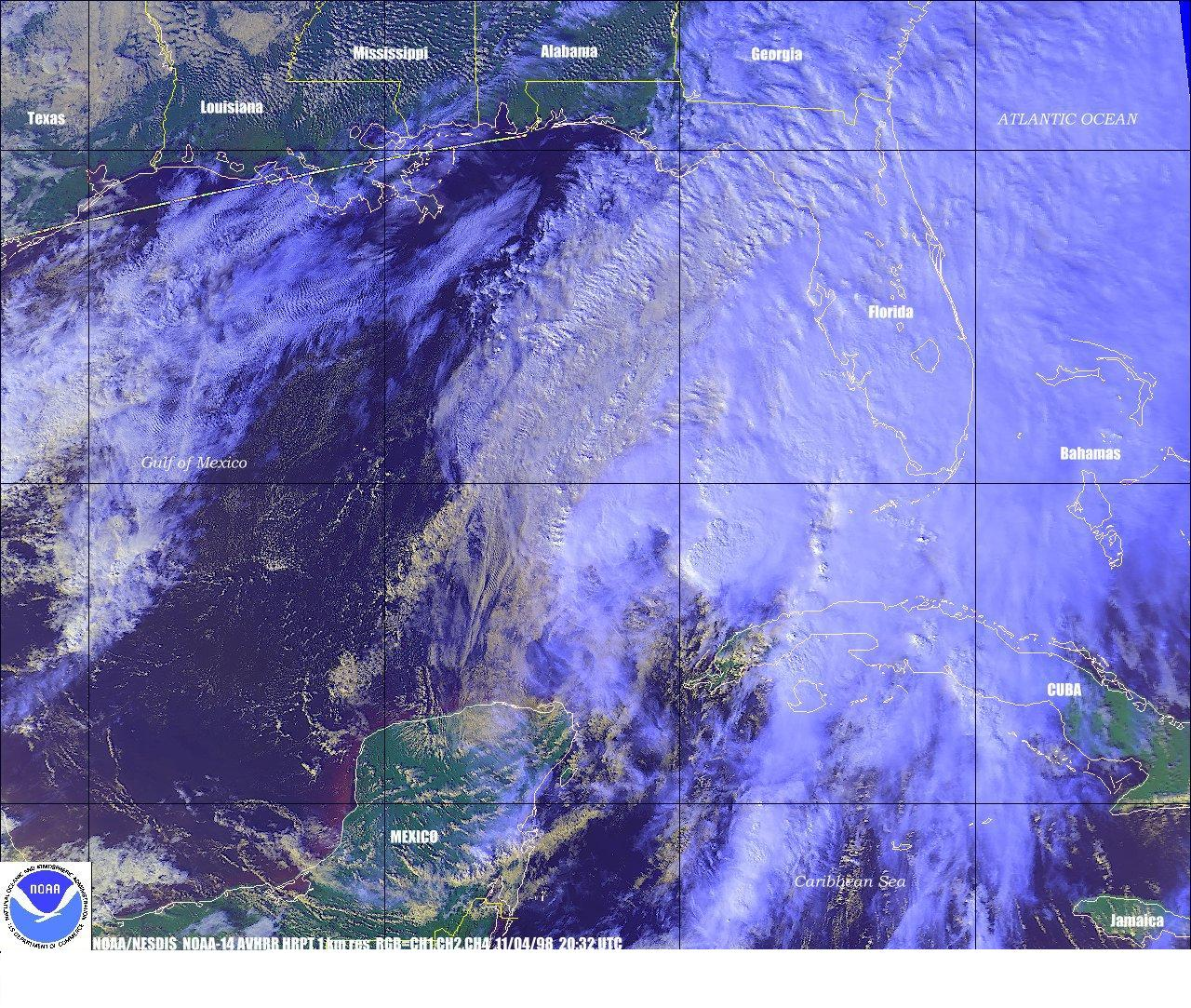
Mitch as a disorganized tropical storm in the Gulf of Mexico

Although the surface low pressure center dissipated, the remnants of Mitch maintained a circulation aloft that reached the Bay of Campeche on November 2. That day, the system began to trigger convection once again. Late on November 3, the Hurricane Hunters observed a well-defined low-level center and flight-level winds of 60 mph (95 km/h). On that basis, the NHC began reissuing advisories on Mitch about 55 mi (90 km) west-southwest of Campeche, Campeche on the Yucatán Peninsula. Upon reforming, Mitch was moving to the east-northeast, influenced by an approaching cold front. Early on November 4, Mitch made landfall just north of Campeche with winds of about 40 mph (65 km/h), and it quickly weakened into a tropical depression while crossing the Yucatán Peninsula.

While Mitch was over eastern Mexico, it had a rainband of deep convection in the eastern periphery. With moderately warm waters and the potential for baroclinity, re-intensification was expected. After emerging into the Gulf of Mexico for a second time on November 4, Mitch restrengthened into a tropical storm, although it was not a purely tropical cyclone; convection was minimal near the core, and the strongest winds were over 230 mi (370 km) from the center. Mitch accelerated toward the coast of Florida as it interacted with the approaching cold front. On November 5, the circulation became elongated, and the NHC commented that "if [it] were not the remnants of Mitch, [they] would probably not be calling [it] a tropical cyclone." The storm strengthened to reach winds of 65 mph (100 km/h) before making a final landfall in southwestern Florida near Naples. It quickly crossed the state, producing five tornadoes and tropical storm-force winds, and the storm emerged into the southwestern Atlantic Ocean. Late on November 5, a Hurricane Hunters flight could not locate a well-defined center associated with Mitch, instead observing an elongated circulation embedded in the cold front. Based on the observations, the NHC declared Mitch as an extratropical cyclone.

The extratropical remnants of Mitch continued quickly to the northeast. On November 6, they passed north of Bermuda, and the following day intensified slightly to winds of 70 mph (110 km/h). By November 9, the remnants passed west of the British Isles, and were last monitored by the NHC later that day.

== See also ==
- Timeline of the 1998 Atlantic hurricane season
- List of Category 5 Atlantic hurricanes
