= Mashup (education) =

Mashups are a combination of two or more data sources that have been integrated into one source. They typically consist of graphics, texts, audio clips, and video that have been sourced from various media such as blogs, wikis, YouTube, Google Maps, etc., into a new product. Remix is a related term, referring to how data sources have been combined to produce a constellation of elements that were not originally intended by the creators. Mashups rely on open and discoverable resources, open and transparent licensing, and open and remixable formats.

In the educational context, mashups are being used as an instructional tool by the teacher and/or as a product created by the student who are responsible for manipulating the data themselves. For example, http://rru.worldbank.org/businessplanet/, is a mashup website that was created by the World Bank to provide learners with data about country GDP, GDP growth, taxes, and other related information about countries around the globe. Students can use this platform to investigate real-world questions and generate their own arguments as a form of inquiry-based learning. Also, this places students into the role of the participant in the internet as they engage in discovering, remixing, and sharing content. As a result, mashups provide pedagogical opportunities, among them, as a tool within the constructivist approach to learning and also a way of teaching digital literacy, science, social studies, video production, and web development. Mashups rely on open and discoverable resources, open and transparent licensing, and open and remixable formats.

== Uses in the classroom ==
=== Student-created mashups ===
Students can create mashups as objects for evaluation and assessment in the classroom. Mashups can be included in reports and assignments to provide a visual representation to describe data and to "demonstrate mastery of a subject". On the internet learners access free development platforms such as Yahoo’s Pipes, Google Mashup Editor, and Microsoft’s Popfly. One example of a student created mashup project is MapSkip. Students manipulated a Google Map by marking different places they have visited by adding their videos, audio clips, or images. Student created mashups are also used in Higher Education; graduate students in a YouTube for Educators course learned to make mashups for their students, incorporating three or more video clips from different sources into an educational short on YouTube. The goals of this project were not only learning video editing skills, but also "raise[ing] awareness of copyright issues and how to obtain media online from public sources". This ties into teaching digital literacy as students need to be able to "effectively and critically navigate, evaluate and create information using a range of digital technology" (digital literacy wiki page).

=== Mashups as learning materials ===
Because research can be displayed on interactive graphs, charts, or maps to clarify difficult concepts for the learners through a mashup, they can serve as dynamic learning materials for students to use in the classroom. Students can use this platform to "reach new conclusions or discern new relationships by uniting large amounts of data in a manageable way". This would facilitate inquiry-based learning as students investigate and generate their own arguments dealing with real-world problems (Archambault et al.). For example, a fifth grade classroom used Mapdango to explore US National Parks. Mapdango uses data from Wikipedia, Google Maps, Panoramia, and weather data to create reports about a specific national park. Students used this mashup to get additional information when exploring the National Parks.

== Limitations and criticisms ==
A common issue surrounding the widespread use of mashups in education is the lack of open and discoverable resources because of non-transparent licensing issues (Snelson). Educators must be wary of issues of plagiarism and copyright infringement in their student-created mashups and in those they present to their students. Issues of the legal reuse of media should be explicitly addressed by instructors. Problems with data accuracy, content appropriateness and stability play into the credibility of mashups' use in the educational context. As mashups are a dynamic resource (and user-generated), they can be unpredictable in their uses. In addition, "most publicly available data used in mashups today (e.g., Flickr or YouTube) are not designed for educational purposes."
