= Mashed potato (disambiguation) =

Mashed potato is a common way of serving potato, made by mashing boiled potatoes.

Mashed potato or mashed potatoes may also refer to:

- Mashed Potato (dance), a dance move that was popular during the early 1960s
- "(Do the) Mashed Potatoes", a 1960 single by Nat Kendrick and the Swans featuring James Brown
- Mashed Potatoes (Smashing Pumpkins album), 1994
- Mashed Potatoes (Steve Alaimo album), 1962
- Instant mashed potatoes, a convenience food
- Aloo chokha (roughly translated to "mashed potatoes"), a Bengali dish

== See also ==
- "Mashed Potatoes U.S.A.", a 1962 single by James Brown
- "Mashed Potato Time", a 1962 song by Dee Dee Sharp
