= Henry Mish Barn =

- U.S. National Register of Historic Places
- Virginia Landmarks Register
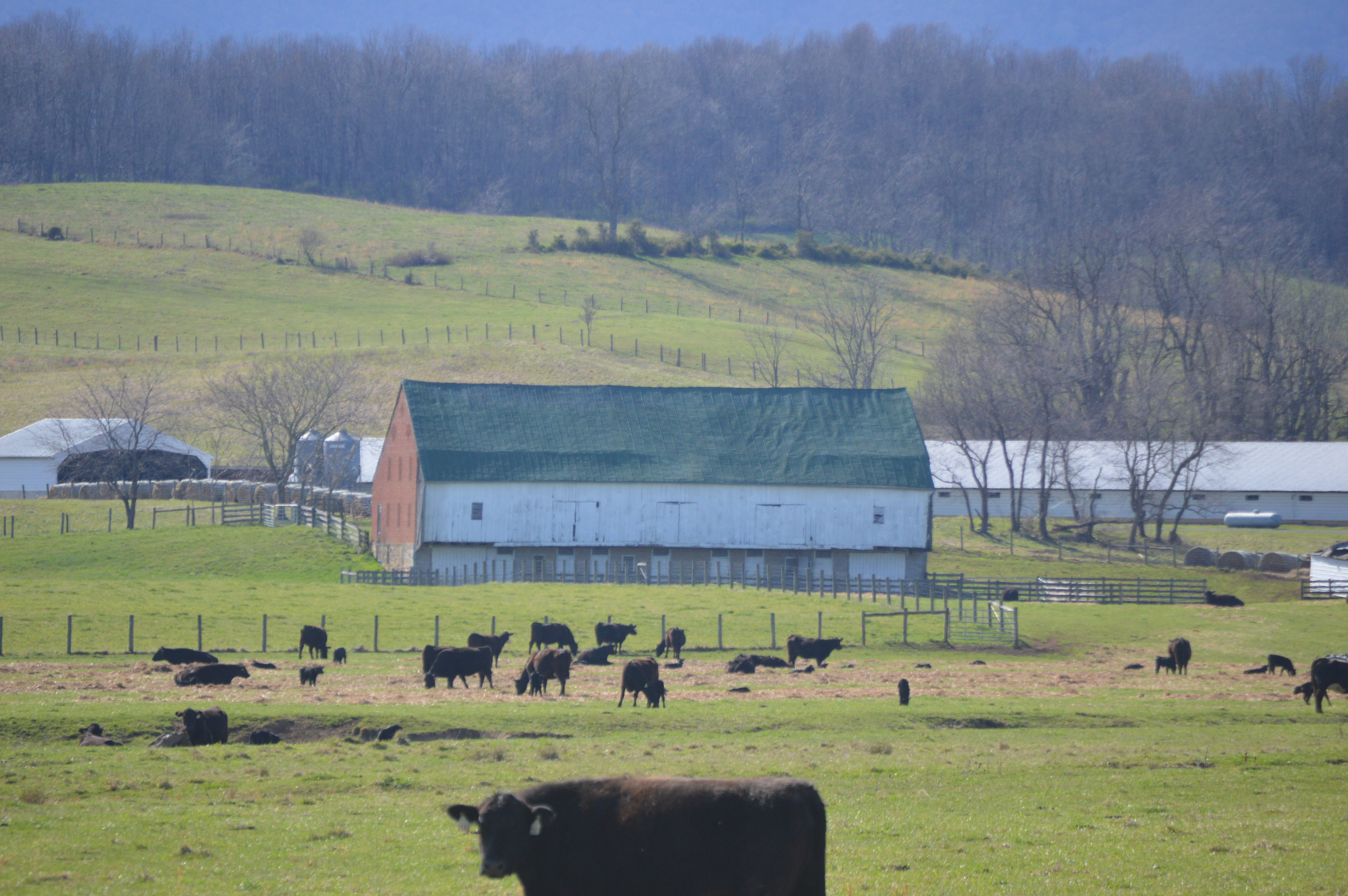
- Distant view from the east

- Location within Virginia Location within the United States
- Location: North of Middlebrook on VA 876, near Middlebrook, Virginia
- Coordinates: 38°03′53″N 79°13′25″W
- Area: 97 acres (39 ha)
- Built: 1849
- Architectural style: Bank Barn
- NRHP reference No.: 83003260
- VLR No.: 007-0122

Significant dates
- Added to NRHP: February 10, 1983
- Designated VLR: December 14, 1982

Henry Mish Barn, also known as Mish Barn and Heritage Hill Barn, is a historic Pennsylvania bank barn located near Middlebrook, Augusta County, Virginia. It was built about 1849, and measures 50 feet by 100 feet. The ends of the barn feature decorative brick lattice vents in lozenge patterns, a feature prevalent in Pennsylvania barns. It is one of the few pre-American Civil War examples to have survived the Valley barn-burning campaigns by Union forces. Associated with the brick barn are the contributing Mish House and two related outbuildings. The barn was built for Henry Mish, a native of York County, Pennsylvania who settled in southwestern Augusta County in 1839.

It was listed on the National Register of Historic Places in 1983.
