= MASH-1 =

Cryptographic hash function

For a cryptographic hash function (a mathematical algorithm), a MASH-1 (Modular Arithmetic Secure Hash) is a hash function based on modular arithmetic.

== History ==
Despite many proposals, few hash functions based on modular arithmetic have withstood attack, and most that have tend to be relatively inefficient. MASH-1 evolved from a long line of related proposals successively broken and repaired.

== Standard ==
Committee Draft ISO/IEC 10118-4 (Nov 95)

== Description ==
MASH-1 involves use of an RSA-like modulus $N$, whose bitlength affects the security. $N$ is a product of two prime numbers and should be difficult to factor, and for $N$ of unknown factorization, the security is based in part on the difficulty of extracting modular roots.

Let $L$ be the length of a message block in bit. $N$ is chosen to have a binary representation a few bits longer than $L$, typically $L < |N| \leq L+16$.

The message is padded by appending the message length and is separated into blocks $D_1, \cdots, D_q$ of length $L/2$. From each of these blocks $D_i$, an enlarged block $B_i$ of length $L$ is created by placing four bits from $D_i$ in the lower half of each byte and four bits of value 1 in the higher half. These blocks are processed iteratively by a compression function:

$$H_0 = IV$$
$$H_i = f(B_i, H_{i-1}) = ((((B_i \oplus H_{i-1}) \vee E)^e \bmod N) \bmod 2^L) \oplus H_{i-1}; \quad i=1,\cdots,q$$

Where $E=15 \cdot 2^{L-4}$ and $e=2$. $\vee$ denotes the bitwise OR and $\oplus$ the bitwise XOR.

From $H_q$ are now calculated more data blocks $D_{q+1},\cdots,D_{q+8}$ by linear operations (where $\|$ denotes concatenation):

$$H_q = Y_1 \,\|\, Y_3 \,\|\, Y_0 \,\|\, Y_2; \quad |Y_i| = L/4$$
$$Y_i = Y_{i-1} \oplus Y_{i-4}; \quad i=4,\cdots,15$$
$$D_{q+i} = Y_{2i-2} \,\|\, Y_{2i-1}; \quad i=1,\cdots,8$$

These data blocks are now enlarged to $B_{q+1},\cdots,B_{q+8}$ like above, and with these the compression process continues with eight more steps:

$$H_i = f(B_i, H_{i-1}); \quad i=q+1,\cdots,q+8$$

Finally the hash value is $H_{q+8} \bmod p$, where $p$ is a prime number with $7\cdot 2^{L/2-3} < p < 2^{L/2}$.

== MASH-2 ==
There is a newer version of the algorithm called MASH-2 with a different exponent. The original $e=2$ is replaced by $e=2^8+1$. This is the only difference between these versions.
