= Mash (restaurant chain) =

Danish steakhouse chain

Restaurant information
- Other locations: Denmark; Germany
- Website: www.mashsteak.dk/home/

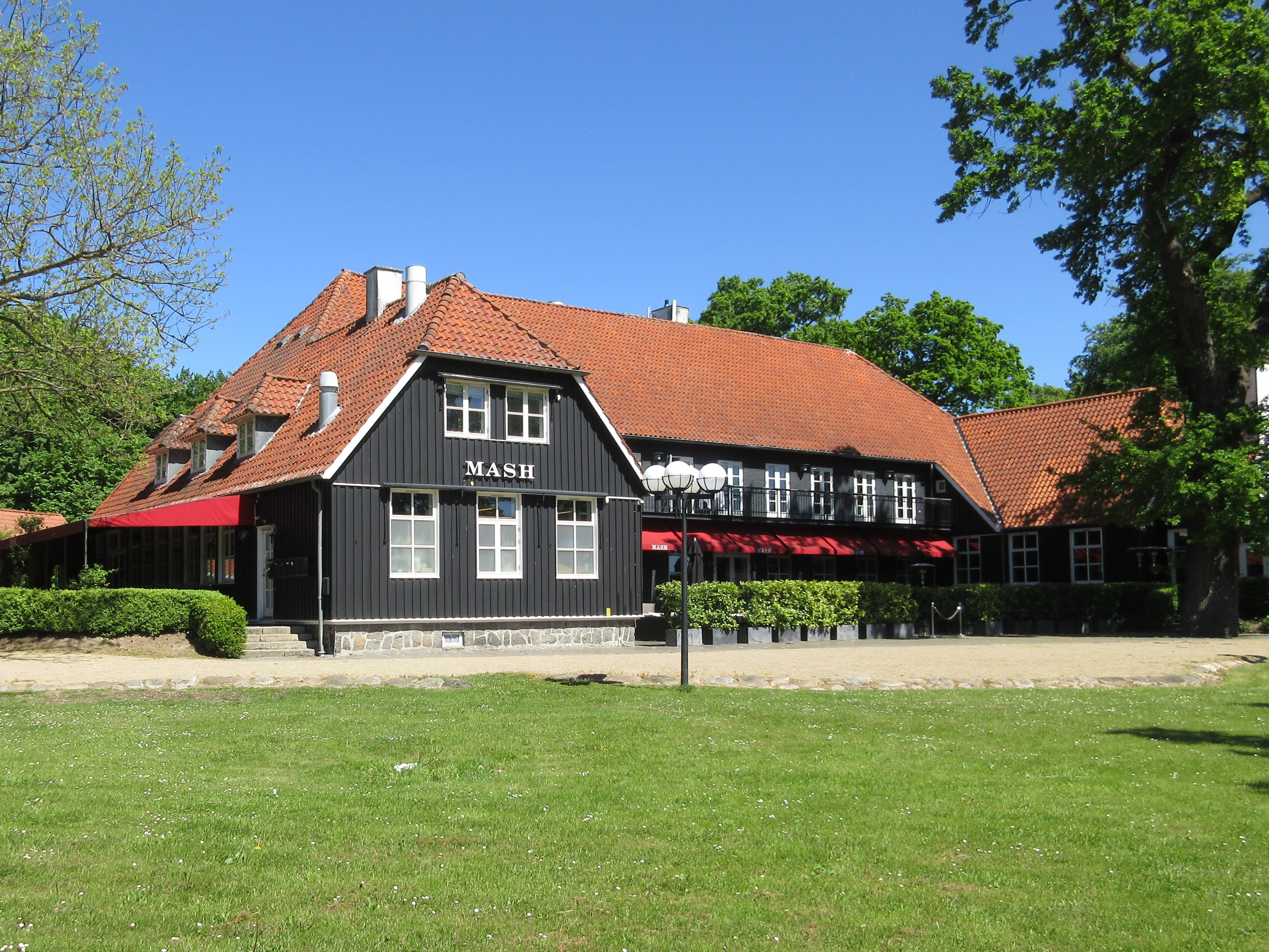
MASH Skovriderkroen in Charlottenlund, Denmark

MASH ("Modern American Steak House") is a chain of high-end steakhouses based in Copenhagen, Denmark.

== History ==
The first Mash steakhouse opened on Bredgade in Copenhagen in 2009. In 2012, a Mash restaurant opened in a building owned by Crown Estates on Brewer Street in London's Soho neighbourhood. In April 2013, The Daily Telegraph commented that the team behind Mash had "set the London steakhouse scene on fire" with their restaurant which won the award for Restaurant of the Year at the 2013 London Lifestyle Awards. Mash closed their London restaurant in 2019.

The first Mash restaurant in Germany opened on Große Elbstrasse in Hamburg in August 2015.

== Ownership ==
Mash is owned by Copenhagen Concepts which also runs the restaurants Le Sommelier and Umami. Jesper Boelskifte is CEO of the company. The group of owners also include Mikkel Glahn and Erik Gemal. The chef Francis Cardenau, one of the founding partners, sold his share of the company in 2017.

== Restaurants ==
Denmark

- Mash City, Bredgade, Copenhagen
- Mash Airport, Copenhagen Airport, Copenhagen
- Mash Penthouse, Tivoli Hotel and Congress Center, Kalvebod Brygge, Copenhagen
- Mash Skovriderkroen, Charlottenlund, Copenhagen
- Mash Rungsted, Rungsted Marina, Rungsted, Copenhagen
- Mash Aarhus, Aarhus, Aarhus
- MASH Odense, Odense

Germany

- MASH Düsseldorf, Düsseldorf
- MASH Hamburg, Hamburg
