= Multi-Agency Safeguarding Hub =

Safeguarding collaboration in the UK

Multi-Agency Safeguarding Hubs (MASH) in the United Kingdom are co-operative arrangements formed between numerous safeguarding focused organisations, with the aim of close collaborative working to put the victim at the heart of all decisions whilst removing to as great an extent as possible any inter-agency rivalries or politics. It is an example of the modern idea of plural policing.

== Aims ==
The aim of the MASH is to bring together all the agencies involved in safeguarding of vulnerable adults and children. This can be when they are victims of domestic abuse, neglect, criminal exploitation of labour, sexual exploitation, child sexual abuse, sexual assault, or any other (normally illegal) act that places them at ongoing risk of harm. The intention of the MASH is to ensure that when such abuses are reported to any of the agencies involved, all the agencies can become aware of it as quickly as possible and use the full range of powers and options available to all of them to put the best possible solutions in place to help the victims.

== Composition ==
MASHs are normally formed of various public and charity sector organisations, commonly including (but not limited to):

- The police
- Social services
- Local education bodies
- Local authorities
- the Probation Service
- Housing co-ordinators
- Independent Domestic Violence Advisors (IDVA's)
- National Society for the Prevention of Cruelty to Children (NSPCC)
- Women's Aid and other domestic abuse related charities
- Healthcare NHS Trusts and Clinical Commissioning Groups

== Background ==
MASH was born out of the introduction of Multi-Agency Public Protection Arrangements and Multi-Agency Risk Assessment Conferences (MARAC) when it was realised that the agencies involved could be much more effective if the co-operation was made more permanent. This also eliminated a lot of issues created by the time-limited MARAC meetings, where often individuals being discussed had little more than 10 minutes for considerations of their cases. MASHs first appeared around 2010 with a collection of a few agencies, by 2013 two-thirds of all local authority areas had them, and now they are commonplace. They are generally accepted to have been implemented by Nigel Boulton, a police officer in Devon and Cornwall Police who realised that in order to make effective safeguarding decisions, as much information as possible was required. This required far more integrated multi-agency co-operation than was previously in existence.

== Outcomes ==
Research has suggested that of all the referrals made into the MASH by the police, only 57.5% are passed on to social services, and only 4.8% of cases actually received some kind of social care input (eg. a visit by a social worker).
