= Timeline of the 1998 Atlantic hurricane season =

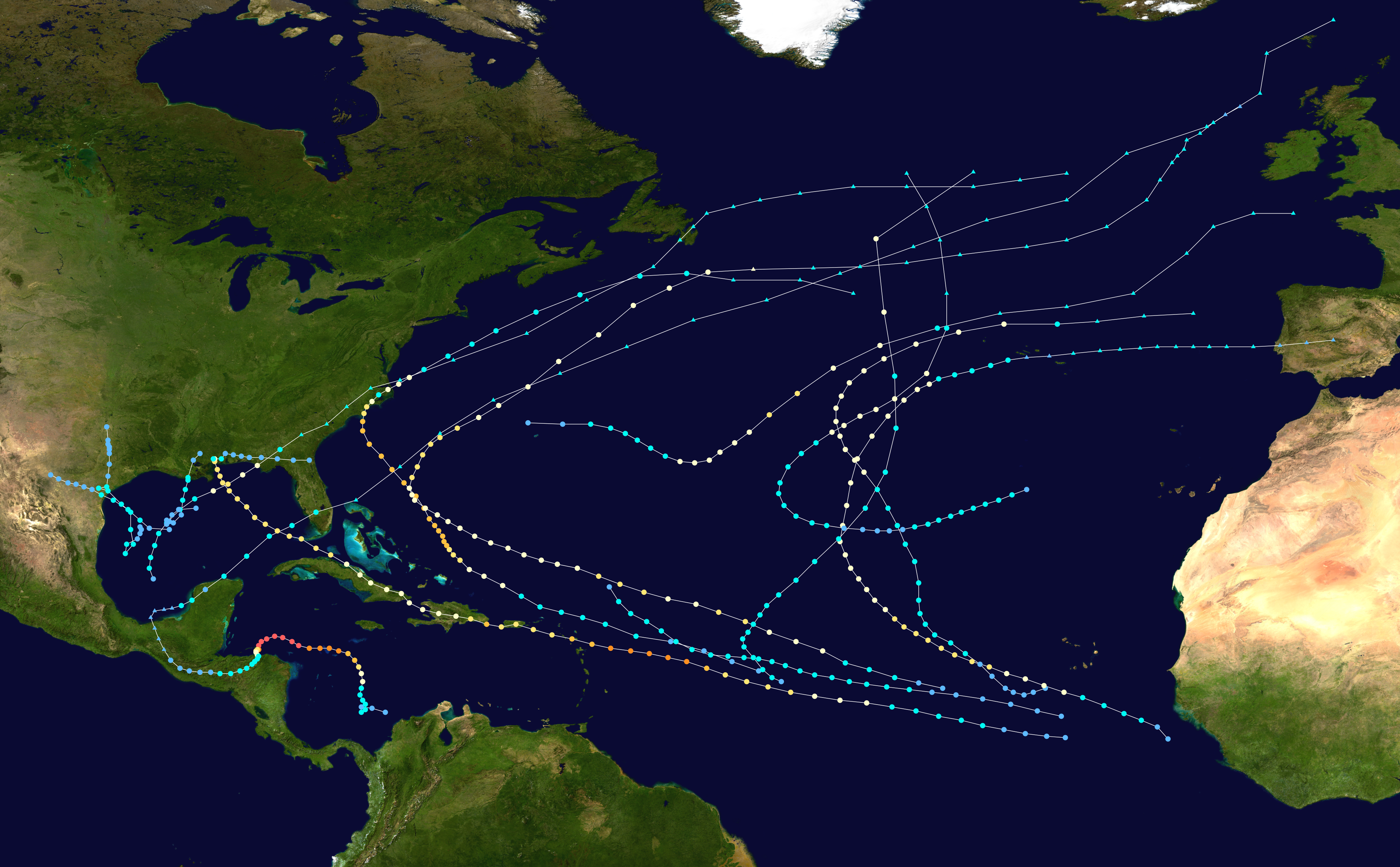
- Season summary map

Season boundaries
- First system formed: July 27,1998
- Last system dissipated: December 1, 1998

Strongest system
- Name: Mitch
- Maximum winds: 180 mph (285 km/h) (1-minute sustained)
- Lowest pressure: 905 mbar (hPa; 26.72 inHg)

Longest lasting system
- Name: Georges
- Duration: 16 days
Storm articles
- Hurricane Bonnie (1998)
- Tropical Storm Charley (1998)
- Hurricane Danielle (1998)
- Hurricane Earl (1998)
- Tropical Storm Frances (1998)
- Hurricane Georges
- Tropical Storm Hermine (1998)
- Hurricane Mitch

The 1998 Atlantic hurricane season was the annual cycle of tropical cyclone formation over the Atlantic Ocean north of the equator. The season officially began on June 1 and ended on November 30. This is historically the period during which most subtropical or tropical cyclogenesis occurs over the Atlantic Ocean. The season's first storm, Tropical Storm Alex, formed on July 27; its last, Hurricane Nicole, dissipated on December 1.

The 1998 season generated fourteen named tropical storms, which was above average; (Note: An average Atlantic hurricane season, as defined by the National Oceanic and Atmospheric Administration, has 12 tropical storms, six hurricanes and two major hurricanes.) ten became hurricanes, of which three intensified into major hurricanes. (Note: A major hurricane is an Atlantic or Pacific hurricane that reaches Category 3 (111 mph (179 km/h)) or higher on the five-level Saffir–Simpson scale.) Ten of these storms formed during a five-week period at the height of the season, August 19 – September 23. Four hurricanes—Georges, Ivan, Jeanne, and Karl—were simultaneously active on September 25, a single-day record.

The two most significant storms of the season, in terms of loss of life and damage, were hurricanes Georges and Mitch. Georges moved from the Caribbean Sea to the Gulf of Mexico and ultimately to the United States Gulf Coast, resulting extensive damage and a large number of fatalities, especially in Haiti and the Dominican Republic. Mitch formed over the southwestern Caribbean Sea and then moved slowly over Central America, causing catastrophic flooding and leaving more than 11,000 people dead, making it the second deadliest Atlantic hurricane in history after the Great Hurricane of 1780.

This timeline documents tropical cyclone formations, strengthening, weakening, landfalls, extratropical transitions, and dissipations during the season. It includes information that was not released throughout the season, meaning that data from post-storm reviews by the National Hurricane Center, such as a storm that was not initially warned upon, has been included.

The time stamp for each event is first stated using Coordinated Universal Time (UTC), the 24-hour clock where 00:00 = midnight UTC. The NHC uses both UTC and the time zone where the center of the tropical cyclone is currently located. The time zones utilized (east to west) prior to 2020 were: Atlantic, Eastern, and Central. In this timeline, the respective area time is included in parentheses. Additionally, figures for maximum sustained winds and position estimates are rounded to the nearest 5 units (miles, or kilometers), following National Hurricane Center practice. Direct wind observations are rounded to the nearest whole number. Atmospheric pressures are listed to the nearest millibar and nearest hundredth of an inch of mercury.

== Timeline ==
=== June ===
June 1

- The 1998 Atlantic hurricane season officially begins.

=== July ===
July 27

- 12:00 UTC (8:00 a.m. AST) at 11.3°N 25.4°W – Tropical Depression One develops from a tropical wave about 300 miles (480 km) south-southwest of Cape Verde.

July 29

- 00:00 UTC (8:00 p.m. AST, July 28) at 13.3°N 36.8°W – Tropical Depression One strengthens into Tropical Storm Alex about 885 mi (1,425 km) west of Cape Verde.

July 31

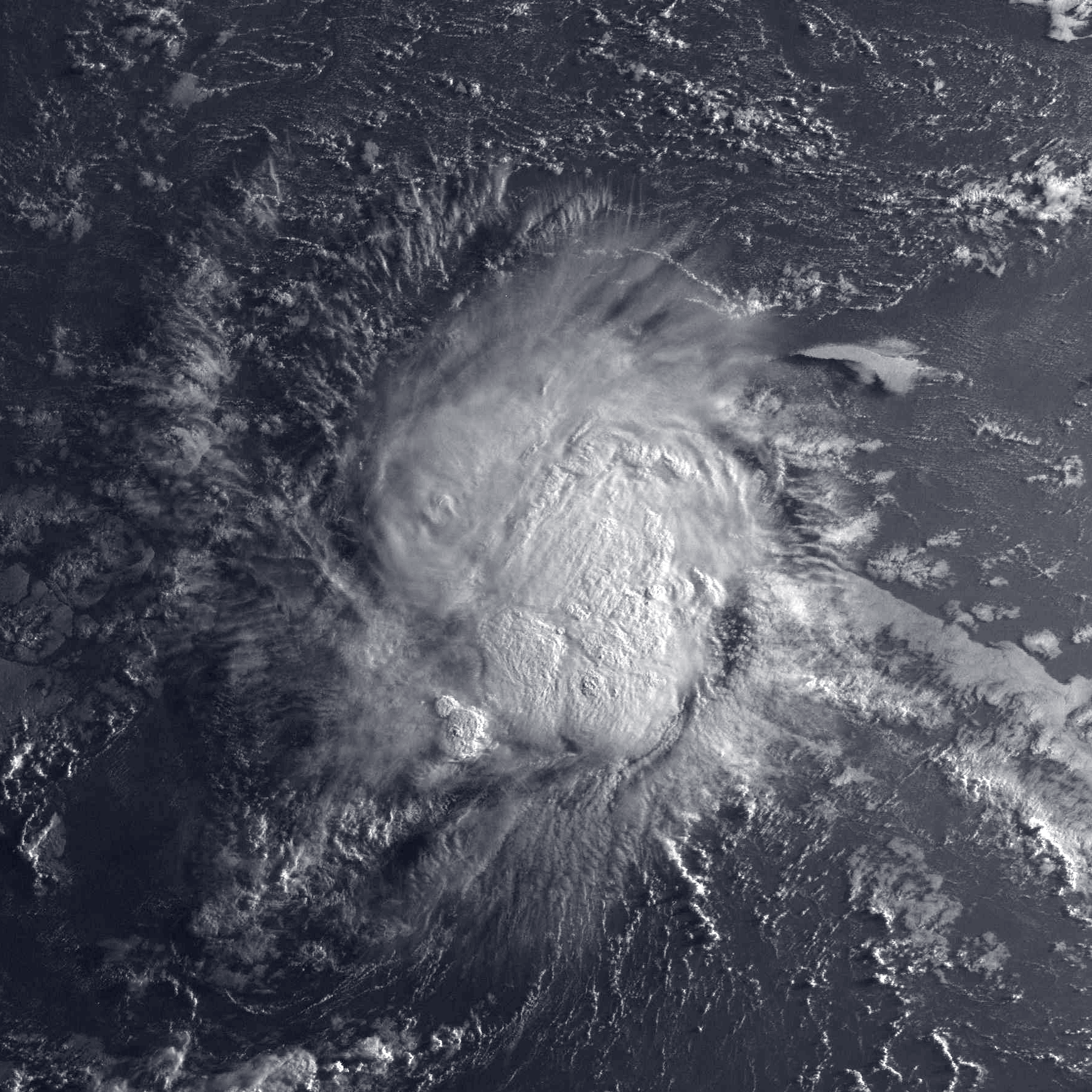
Tropical Storm Alex near peak intensity on July 31

- 00:00 UTC (8:00 p.m. AST, July 30) at 15.4°N 47.1°W – Tropical Storm Alex attains its peak intensity, with maximum sustained winds of 50 mph (85 km/h) and a minimum central pressure of 1,002 mbar (29.59 inHg), about 925 mi (1,490 km) east of Martinique. (Note: The figures for maximum sustained winds and position estimates are rounded to the nearest 5 units (knots, miles, or kilometers), following the convention used in the National Hurricane Center's operational products for each storm. All other units are rounded to the nearest digit.)

=== August ===
August 2

- 18:00 UTC (2:00 p.m. AST) at 21.0°N 59.3°W – Tropical Storm Alex weakens into a tropical depression about 455 mi (730 km) north-northeast of Martinique, dissipating shortly thereafter.

August 19

- 12:00 UTC (8:00 a.m. AST) at 14.7°N 48.1°W – Tropical Depression Two develops from a tropical wave about 930 mi (1,500 km) east of Barbuda.

August 20

- 12:00 UTC (8:00 a.m. AST) at 17.3°N 57.3°W – Tropical Depression Two strengthens into Tropical Storm Bonnie about 300 mi (480 km) east of Barbuda.

August 21

- 06:00 UTC (1:00 a.m. CDT) at 25.3°N 92.3°W – Tropical Depression Three forms from an area of unsettled weather about 330 mi (530 km) east of Brownsville, Texas.
- 18:00 UTC (1:00 p.m. CDT) at 26.0°N 94.5°W – Tropical Depression Three strengthens into Tropical Storm Charley about 185 mi (295 km) east of Brownsville.

August 22

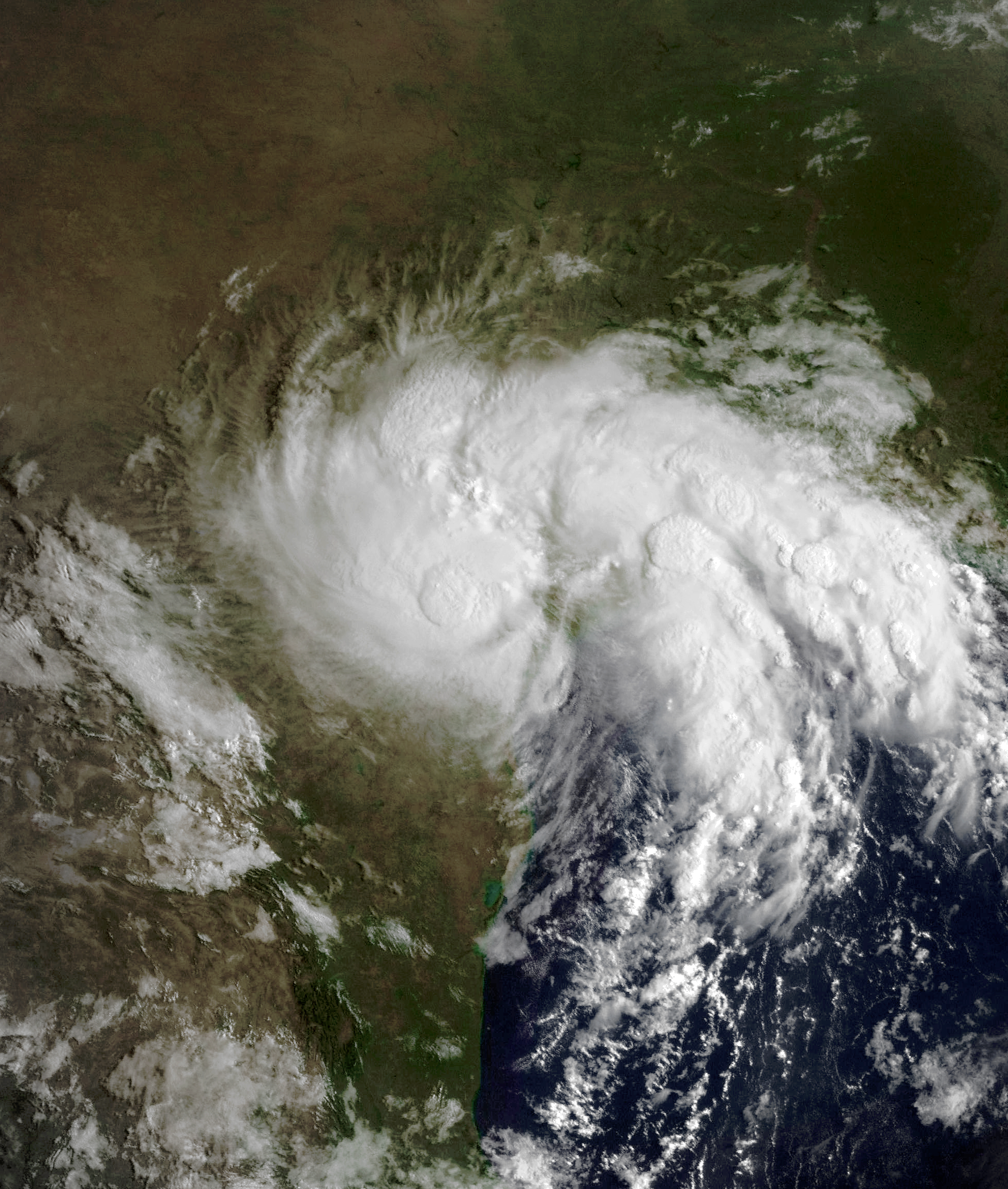
Tropical Storm Charley after landfall on August 22

- 00:00 UTC (8:00 p.m. EDT, August 21) at 21.1°N 67.3°W – Tropical Storm Bonnie strengthens into a Category 1 hurricane about 185 mi (295 km) north-northeast of Cabo Engaño, Dominican Republic.
- 06:00 UTC (1:00 a.m. CDT) at 27.5°N 96.5°W – Tropical Storm Charley attains peak maximum sustained winds of 70 mph (110 km/h) about 40 mph (65 km/h) southeast of Port Aransas, Texas.
- 10:00 UTC (5:00 a.m. CDT) at 27.8°N 97.1°W – Tropical Storm Charley makes landfall near Port Aransas as it attains a minimum central pressure of 1000 mbar (29.53 inHg), accompanied by maximum sustained winds of 45 mph (75 km/h).
- 18:00 UTC (2:00 p.m. EDT) at 23.0°N 70.5°W – Hurricane Bonnie strengthens to Category 2 intensity about 265 mi (425 km) east-southeast of San Salvador Island in the Bahamas.
- 18:00 UTC (1:00 p.m. CDT) at 28.3°N 98.1°W – Tropical Storm Charley weakens into a tropical depression over land about 70 mi (110 km) west-northwest of Port Aransas.

August 23

- 12:00 UTC (8:00 a.m. EDT) at 24.1°N 71.5°W – Hurricane Bonnie strengthens to Category 3 intensity about 190 mi (305 km) east of San Salvador Island.

August 24

- 00:00 UTC (8:00 p.m. EDT, August 23) at 24.8°N 71.8°W – Hurricane Bonnie attains its peak intensity, with maximum sustained winds of 115 mph (185 km/h) and a minimum central pressure of 954 mbar (28.17 inHg), about 180 mi (285 km) east-northeast of San Salvador Island.
- 00:00 UTC (7:00 p.m. CDT, August 23) at 29.4°N 101.2°W – Tropical Depression Charley is last noted as a tropical cyclone over land about 15 mi (30 km) west of Del Rio, Texas, dissipating shortly thereafter.
- 06:00 UTC (2:00 a.m. AST) at 13.4°N 34.3°W – Tropical Depression Four forms from a tropical wave about 720 mi (1,160 km) west of Cape Verde.
- 18:00 UTC (2:00 p.m. AST) at 14.2°N 37.9°W – Tropical Depression Four strengthens into Tropical Storm Danielle about 950 mi (1,530 km) west of Cape Verde.

August 25

- 12:00 UTC (8:00 a.m. AST) at 16.2°N 43.3°W – Tropical Storm Danielle strengthens into a Category 1 hurricane about 1,305 mi (2,100 km) west of Cape Verde.

August 26

Hurricane Bonnie approaching the Carolinas late on August 26

- 06:00 UTC (2:00 a.m. AST) at 18.9°N 49.1°W – Hurricane Danielle strengthens to Category 2 intensity about 835 mi (1,345 km) east of Barbuda, and simultaneously attains peak maximum sustained winds of 105 mph (165 km/h).
- 18:00 UTC (2:00 p.m. AST) at 19.7°N 52.8°W – Hurricane Danielle weakens to Category 1 intensity about 605 mi (970 km) east-northeast of Barbuda.

August 27

- 00:00 UTC (8:00 p.m. EDT, August 26) at 34.0°N 77.7°W – Hurricane Bonnie weakens to Category 2 intensity about 15 mi (30 km) southeast of Wilmington, North Carolina.
- 04:00 UTC (12:00 a.m. EDT) at 34.4°N 77.7°W – Hurricane Bonnie makes landfall about 15 mi (30 km) northeast of Wilmington with maximum sustained winds of 110 mph (175 km/h) and a central pressure of 964 mbar (28.47 inHg).
- 06:00 UTC (2:00 a.m. AST) at 20.6°N 56.7°W – Hurricane Danielle restrengthens to Category 2 intensity about 390 mi (630 km) east-northeast of Barbuda.
- 12:00 UTC (8:00 a.m. AST) at 21.2°N 58.5°W – Hurricane Danielle reattains peak maximum sustained winds of 105 mph (165 km/h) about 330 mi (530 km) northeast of Barbuda.
- 12:00 UTC (8:00 a.m. EDT) at 34.9°N 77.1°W – Hurricane Bonnie weakens to Category 1 intensity over land about 65 mi (100 km) northeast of Wilmington.
- 18:00 UTC (2:00 p.m. EDT) at 35.4°N 76.6°W – Hurricane Bonnie weakens into a tropical storm over land about 40 mi (65 km) west-northwest of Ocracoke, North Carolina.

August 28

- 00:00 UTC (8:00 p.m. EDT, August 27) at 35.8°N 75.9°W – Tropical Storm Bonnie restrengthens into a Category 1 hurricane as it moves off the Outer Banks about 45 mi (75 km) north of Ocracoke.
- 00:00 UTC (8:00 p.m. AST, August 27) at 22.4°N 61.7°W – Hurricane Danielle weakens back to Category 1 intensity about 330 mi (530 km) north of Barbuda.
- 18:00 UTC (2:00 p.m. EDT) at 37.3°N 73.2°W – Hurricane Bonnie weakens back into a tropical storm about 155 mi (250 km) east of Cape Henry, Virginia.

August 30

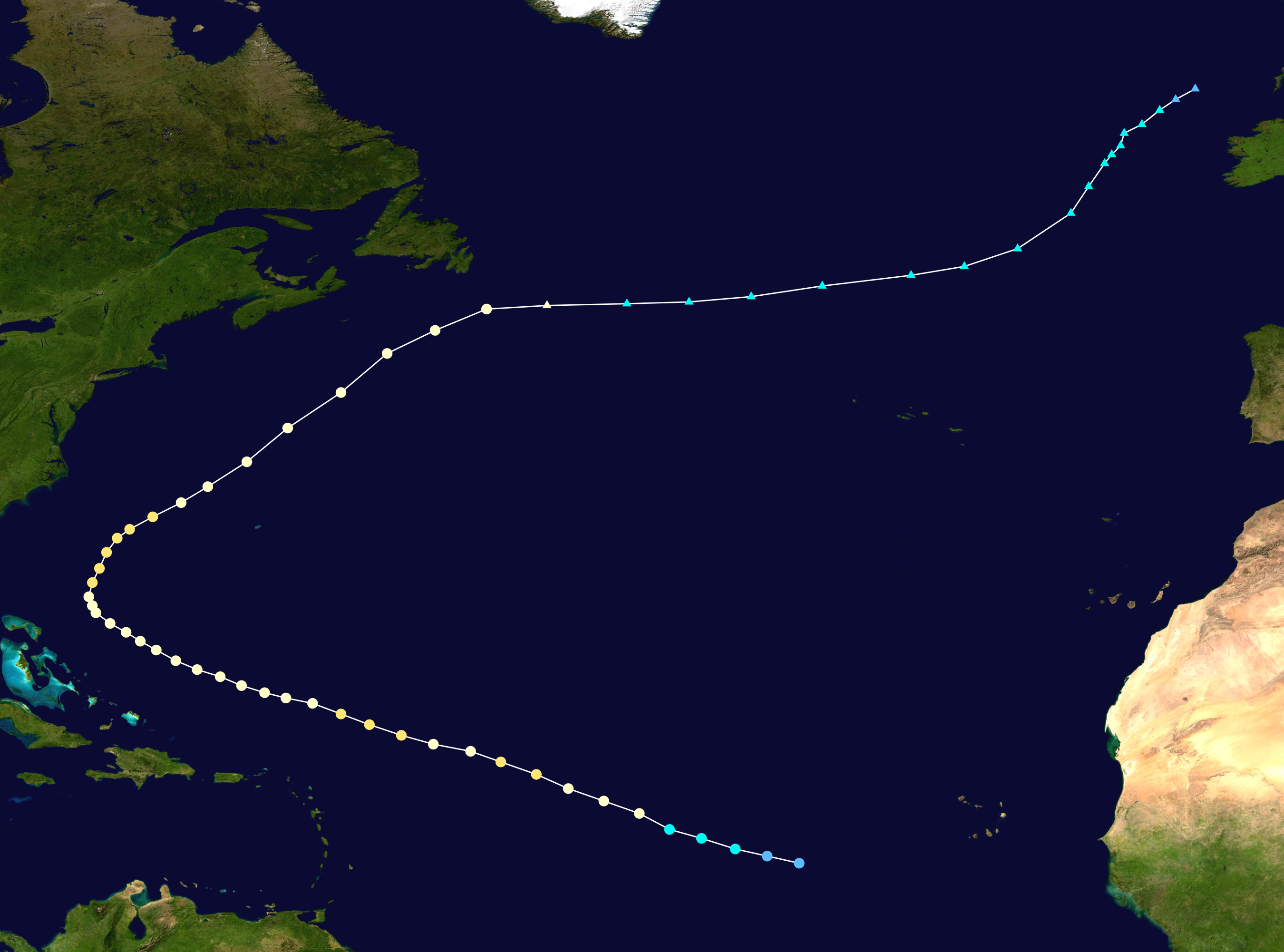
Storm path of Hurricane Danielle

- 18:00 UTC (2:00 p.m. AST) at 44.0°N 50.0°W – Tropical Storm Bonnie transitions into an extratropical cyclone about 235 mi (380 km) south-southeast of Cape Race, Newfoundland, and later dissipates when it is absorbed by a weather front.

August 31

- 12:00 UTC (8:00 a.m. EDT) at 29.2°N 74.1°W – Hurricane Danielle restrengthens to Category 2 intensity about 345 mi (555 km) northeast of Nassau, Bahamas, and simultaneously attains peak maximum sustained winds of 105 mph (165 km/h) for the third time.
- 12:00 UTC (7:00 a.m. CDT) at 21.6°N 93.5°W – The fifth tropical depression of the season forms from a tropical wave in the Gulf of Mexico roughly halfway between Mérida, Yucatán and Tampico, Tamaulipas.
- 18:00 UTC (1:00 p.m. CDT) at 22.4°N 93.8°W – The fifth tropical depression of the season strengthens into Tropical Storm Earl about 575 mi (925 km) south-southwest of New Orleans, Louisiana.

=== September ===
September 1

- 18:00 UTC (2:00 p.m. EDT) at 32.9°N 70.7°W – After weakening slightly, Hurricane Danielle attains peak maximum sustained winds of 105 mph (165 km/h) for the fourth and final time about 350 mi (565 km) west of Bermuda.

September 2

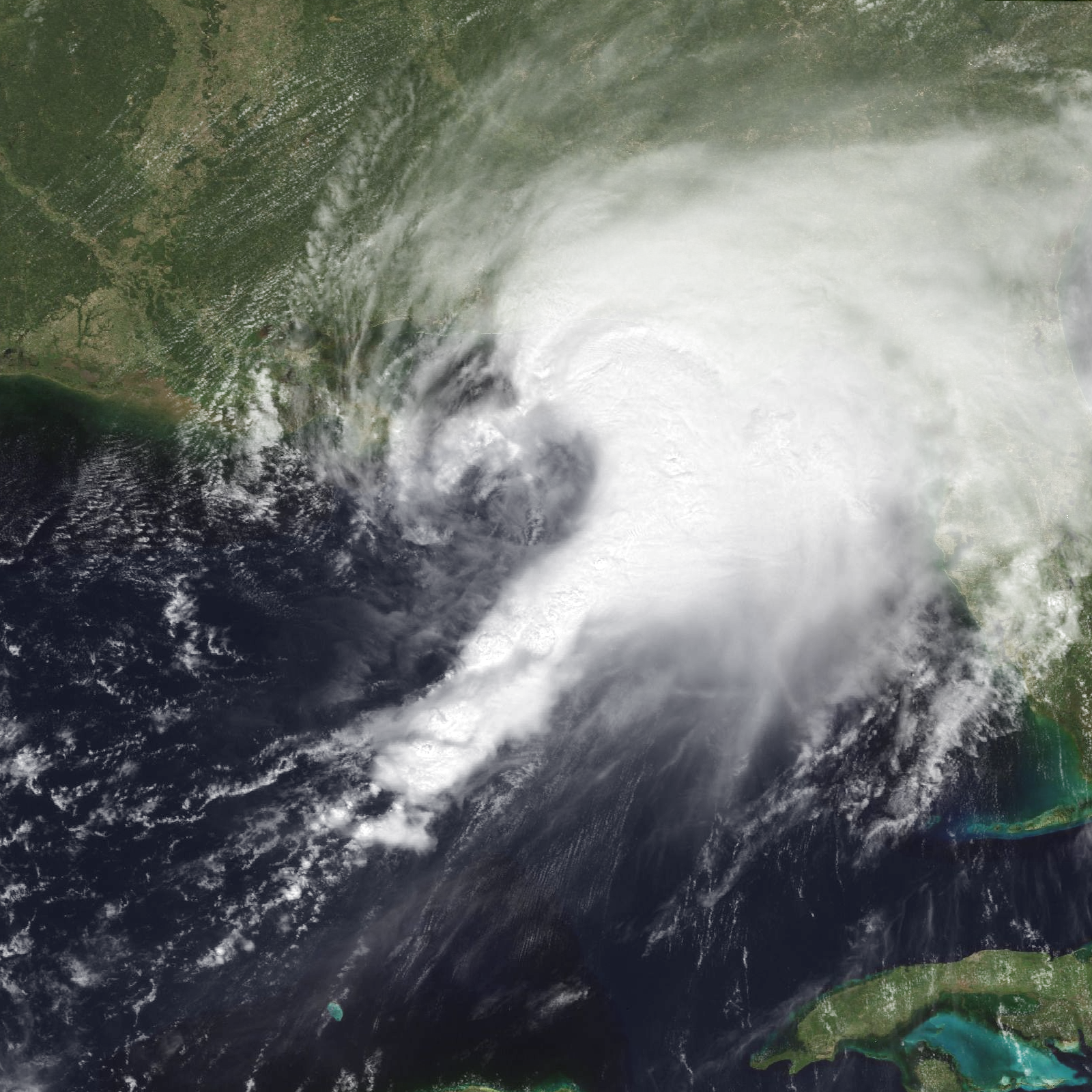
Hurricane Earl near peak intensity on September 2

- 00:00 UTC (8:00 p.m. AST, September 1) at 33.7°N 69.1°W – Hurricane Danielle weakens back to Category 1 intensity about 270 mi (435 km) west-northwest of Bermuda.
- 12:00 UTC (7:00 a.m. CDT) at 28.2°N 89.0°W – Tropical Storm Earl strengthens into a Category 1 hurricane about 140 miles (220 km) south-southeast of New Orleans.
- 18:00 UTC (1:00 p.m. CDT) at 28.7°N 87.9°W – Hurricane Earl strengthens to Category 2 intensity about 115 mi (185 km) southeast of New Orleans, and simultaneously attains peak maximum sustained winds of 100 mph (155 km/h).

September 3

- 00:00 UTC (7:00 p.m CDT, September 2) at 29.4°N 86.8°W – Hurricane Earl weakens to Category 1 intensity about 90 mi (150 km) southwest of Panama City, Florida, but simultaneously attains a minimum central pressure of 985 mbar (29.09 inHg).
- 06:00 UTC (2:00 a.m. AST) at 42.1°N 57.5°W – Hurricane Danielle attains a minimum central pressure of 960 mbar (28.35 inHg) about 385 mi (620 km) southwest of Cape Race, Newfoundland.
- 06:00 UTC (1:00 a.m. CDT) at 30.1°N 85.7°W – Hurricane Earl makes landfall near Panama City with maximum sustained winds of 80 mph (130 km/h) and a central pressure of 987 mbar (29.15 inHg).
- 12:00 UTC (7:00 a.m. CDT) at 31.3°N 84.0°W – Hurricane Earl weakens into a tropical storm over land about 115 mi (185 km) northeast of Panama City.
- 18:00 UTC (1:00 p.m. CDT) at 32.4°N 82.4°W – Tropical Storm Earl transitions into an extratropical cyclone over central Georgia, and subsequently, after moving northeastward away from the Southeastern United States and then crossing over Newfoundland, is absorbed by the extratropical cyclone that was Hurricane Danielle.

September 4

- 00:00 UTC (8:00 p.m. AST, September 3) at 44.8°N 48.5°W – Hurricane Danielle transitions into an extratropical cyclone about 255 mi (405 km) east-southeast of Cape Race, and later dissipates when it merges with another extratropical low.

September 8

- 18:00 UTC (1:00 p.m. CDT) at 25.5°N 94.5°W – Tropical Depression Six forms from a broad low-pressure area about 190 mi (305 km) east of Brownsville.

September 9

- 18:00 UTC (1:00 p.m. CDT) at 24.2°N 95.5°W – Tropical Depression Six strengthens into Tropical Storm Frances about 175 mi (280 km) southeast of Brownsville.

September 11

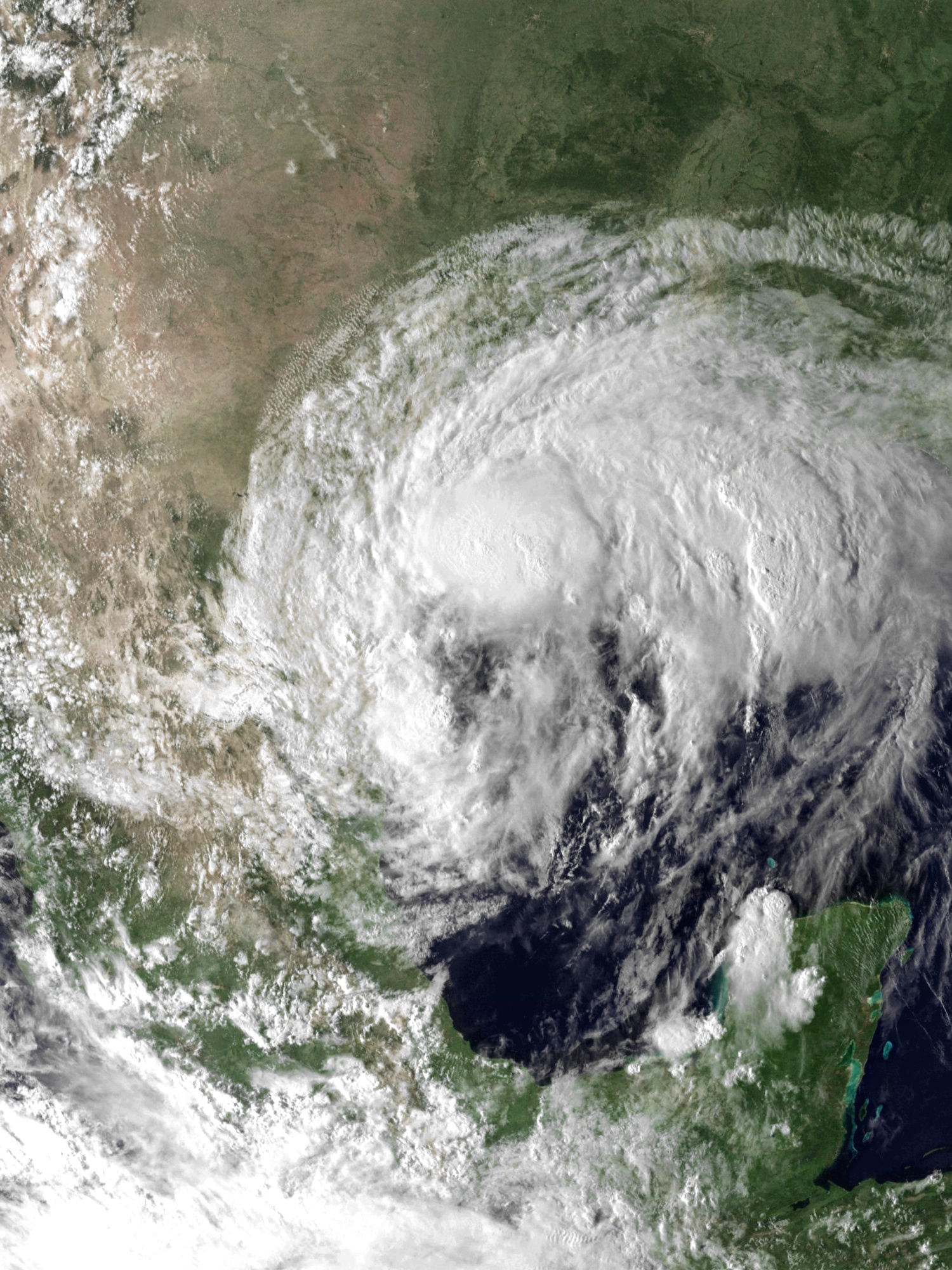
Tropical Storm Frances approaching Texas near peak intensity late on September 10

- 00:00 UTC (7:00 p.m. CDT, September 10) at 27.2°N 95.9°W – Tropical Storm Frances attains peak maximum sustained winds of 65 mph (100 km/h) about 100 mi (155 km) east-southeast of Corpus Christi, Texas.
- 06:00 UTC (1:00 a.m. CDT) at 28.2°N 96.9°W – Tropical Storm Frances attains a minimum central pressure of 990 mbar (29.23 inHg) as it makes landfall about 45 mi (75 km) northeast of Corpus Christi with maximum sustained winds of 50 mph (85 km/h).

September 12

- 00:00 UTC (7:00 p.m. CDT, September 11) at 29.3°N 96.9°W – Tropical Storm Frances weakens into a tropical depression over land about 110 mi (175 km) north-northeast of Corpus Christi.

September 13

- 18:00 UTC (1:00 p.m. CDT) at 33.0°N 97.0°W – Tropical Depression Frances is last noted as a tropical cyclone over land about 15 mi (30 km) northwest of Dallas, Texas. It degenerates into a remnant low shortly thereafter, and later dissipates over Iowa.

September 15

- 12:00 UTC (8:00 a.m. AST) at 9.7°N 25.1°W – Tropical Depression Seven forms from a tropical wave about 395 mi (640 km) south-southwest of Cape Verde.

September 16

- 12:00 UTC (8:00 a.m. AST) at 10.6°N 31.3°W – Tropical Depression Seven strengthens into Tropical Storm Georges about 605 mi (970 km) west-southwest of Cape Verde.

September 17

- 12:00 UTC (7:00 a.m. CDT) at 26.9°N 90.3°W – Tropical Depression Eight forms from a tropical wave over the north-central Gulf of Mexico, about 160 mi (260 km) south of Cocodrie, Louisiana.
- 18:00 UTC (2:00 p.m. AST) at 12.3°N 40.0°W – Tropical Storm Georges strengthens into a Category 1 hurricane about 1,110 mi (1,785 km) west of Cape Verde.

September 18

- 12:00 UTC (8:00 a.m. AST) at 13.1°N 45.7°W – Hurricane Georges strengthens to Category 2 intensity about 1,060 mi (1,705 km) east of Guadeloupe.

September 19

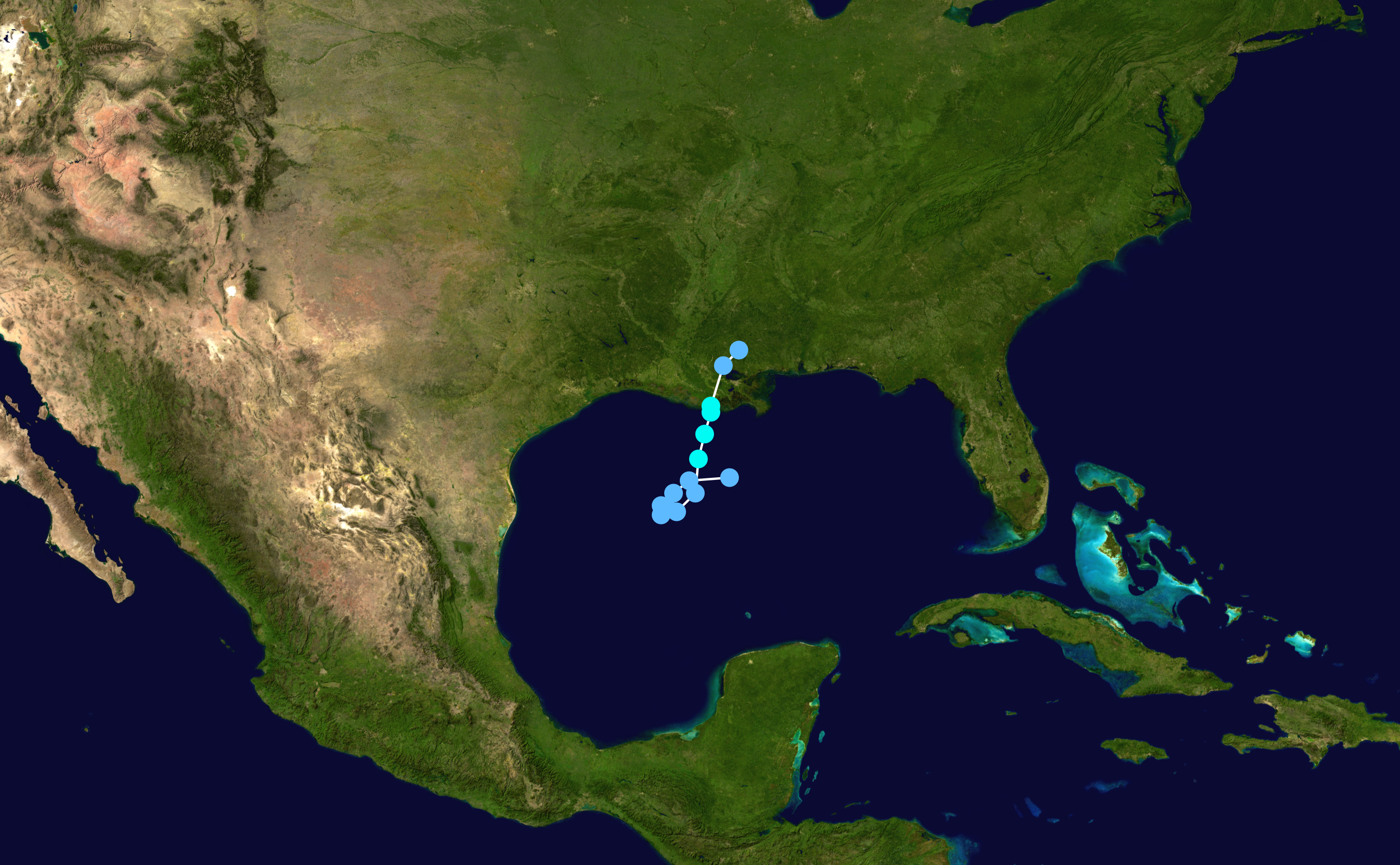
Storm path of Tropical Storm Hermine

- 00:00 UTC (8:00 p.m. AST, September 18) at 13.4°N 26.6°W – Tropical Depression Nine forms from a tropical wave about 235 mi (380 km) southwest of Cape Verde.
- 12:00 UTC (8:00 a.m. AST) at 14.9°N 52.0°W – Hurricane Georges strengthens to Category 3 intensity about 615 mi (990 km) east of Guadeloupe.
- 12:00 UTC (7:00 a.m. CDT) at 27.5°N 91.3°W – Tropical Depression Eight strengthens into Tropical Storm Hermine about 125 mi (205 km) south-southwest of Cocodrie.
- 18:00 UTC (2:00 p.m. AST) at 15.4°N 53.5°W – Hurricane Georges strengthens to Category 4 intensity about 510 mi (825 km) east of Guadeloupe.

September 20

- 00:00 UTC (7:00 p.m. CDT, September 19) at 29.0°N 90.9°W – Tropical Storm Hermine attains its peak intensity, with maximum sustained winds of 45 mph (75 km/h) and a minimum central pressure of 999 mbar (29.50 inHg), about 25 mi (35 km) southwest of Cocodrie.
- 05:00 UTC (12:00 a.m. CDT) at 29.1°N 90.9°W – Tropical Storm Hermine makes landfall about 15 mi (30 km) southwest of Cocodrie with maximum sustained winds of 40 mph (65 km/h) and a central pressure of 1000 mbar (29.53 inHg).
- 06:00 UTC (2:00 a.m. AST) at 16.0°N 56.3°W – Hurricane Georges attains its peak intensity, with maximum sustained winds of 155 mph (250 km/h) and a minimum central pressure of 937 mbar (27.67 inHg), about 320 mi (520 km) east of Guadeloupe.
- 12:00 UTC (7:00 a.m. CDT) at 30.5°N 90.5°W – Tropical Storm Hermine weakens into a tropical depression over land about 85 mi (140 km) north of Cocodrie.
- 18:00 UTC (2:00 p.m. AST) at 16.0°N 32.6°W – Tropical Depression Nine strengthens into Tropical Storm Ivan about 595 mi (955 km) west of Cape Verde.
- 18:00 UTC (1:00 p.m. CDT) at 31.0°N 90.0°W – Tropical Depression Hermine is last noted as a tropical cyclone over land about 100 mi (155 km) west-northwest of Pascagoula, Mississippi, dissipating shortly thereafter.

September 21

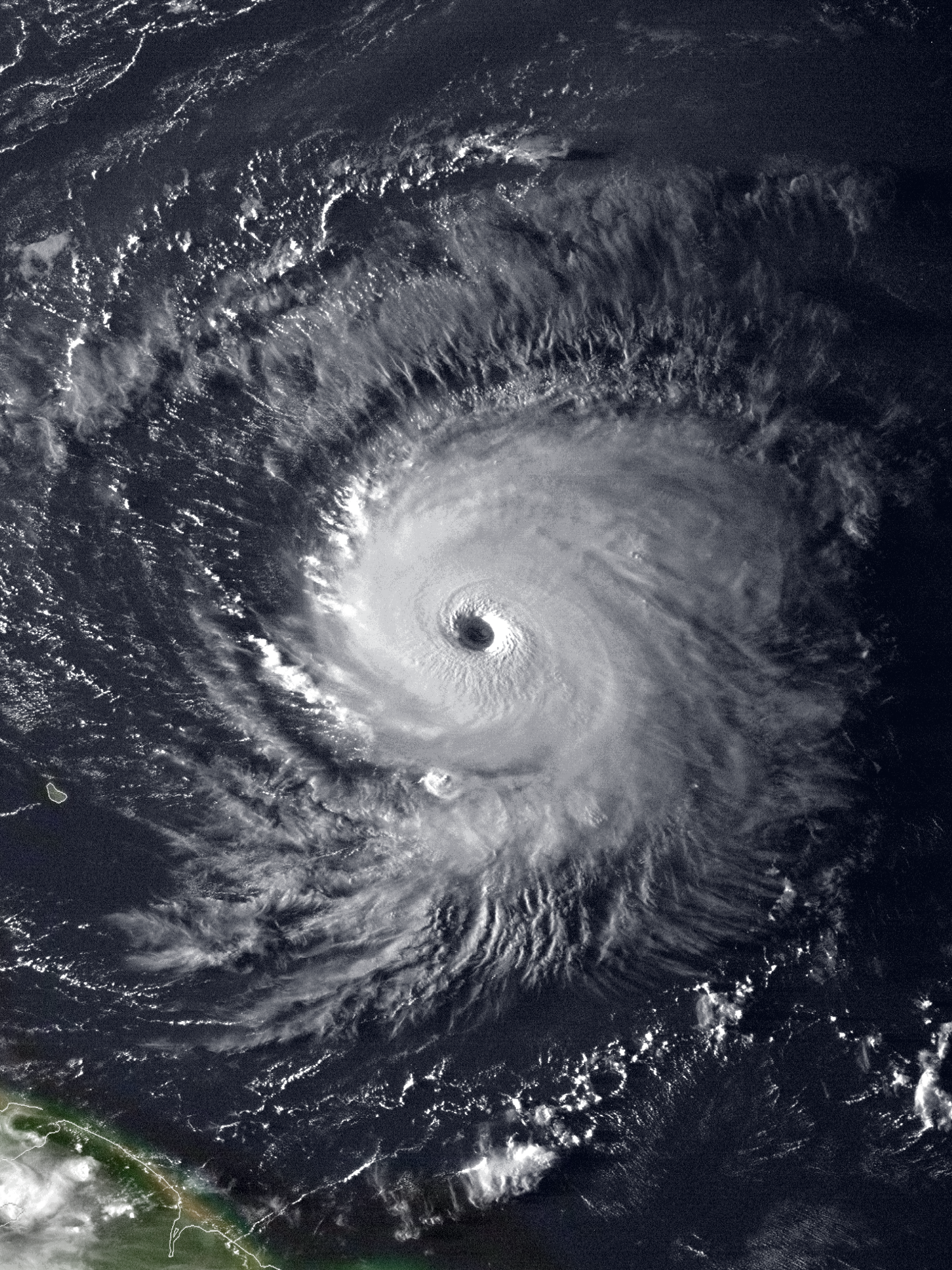
Hurricane Georges near peak intensity late on September 19

- 00:00 UTC (8:00 p.m. AST, September 20) at 16.7°N 60.6°W – Hurricane Georges weakens to Category 3 intensity about 80 mi (130 km) east-southeast of Falmouth, Antigua.
- 04:30 UTC (12:30 a.m. AST) at 17.0°N 61.7°W – Hurricane Georges makes its first landfall near Falmouth with maximum sustained winds of 115 mph (185 km/h) and a central pressure of 966 mbar (28.53 inHg).
- 06:00 UTC (2:00 a.m. AST) at 9.6°N 17.4°W – The tenth tropical depression of the season forms from a tropical wave while located about 160 miles (260 km) southwest of the coast of Guinea-Bissau.
- 08:00 UTC (4:00 a.m. AST) at 17.2°N 62.6°W – Hurricane Georges makes its second landfall near Basseterre, Saint Kitts, with maximum sustained winds of 115 mph (185 km/h) and a central pressure of 966 mbar (28.53 inHg).
- 12:00 UTC (8:00 a.m. AST) at 17.4°N 63.6°W – Hurricane Georges weakens to Category 2 intensity about 150 mi (240 km) east-southeast of Fajardo, Puerto Rico.
- 18:00 UTC (2:00 p.m. AST) at 11.0°N 19.4°W – The tenth tropical depression of the season strengthens into Tropical Storm Jeanne about 415 mi (665 km) southeast of Cape Verde.
- 22:00 UTC (6:00 p.m. EDT) at 18.1°N 65.8°W – Hurricane Georges restrengthens to Category 3 intensity as it makes its third landfall about 15 mi (30 km) south-southwest of Fajardo with maximum sustained winds of 115 mph (185 km/h) and a central pressure of 968 mbar (28.59 inHg).

September 22

- 00:00 UTC (8:00 p.m. EDT, September 21) at 18.2°N 66.3°W – Hurricane Georges weakens back to Category 2 intensity over land about 45 mi (75 km) west of Fajardo, and later emerges over the Mona Passage.
- 12:00 UTC (8:00 a.m. EDT) at 18.2°N 68.5°W – Hurricane Georges restrengthens to Category 3 intensity about 100 mi (155 km) east of Santo Domingo, Dominican Republic.
- 12:30 UTC (8:30 a.m. EDT) at 18.2°N 68.7°W – Hurricane Georges makes its fourth landfall about 80 mi (130 km) east of Santo Domingo with maximum sustained winds of 120 mph (195 km/h) and a central pressure of 962 mbar (28.41 inHg).
- 18:00 UTC (2:00 p.m. EDT) at 18.6°N 69.7°W – Hurricane Georges weakens back to Category 2 intensity over land about 15 mi (30 km) east-northeast of Santo Domingo.
- 18:00 UTC (2:00 p.m. AST) at 13.1°N 25.2°W – Tropical Storm Jeanne strengthens into a Category 1 hurricane about 185 miles (295 km) southwest of Cape Verde.

September 23

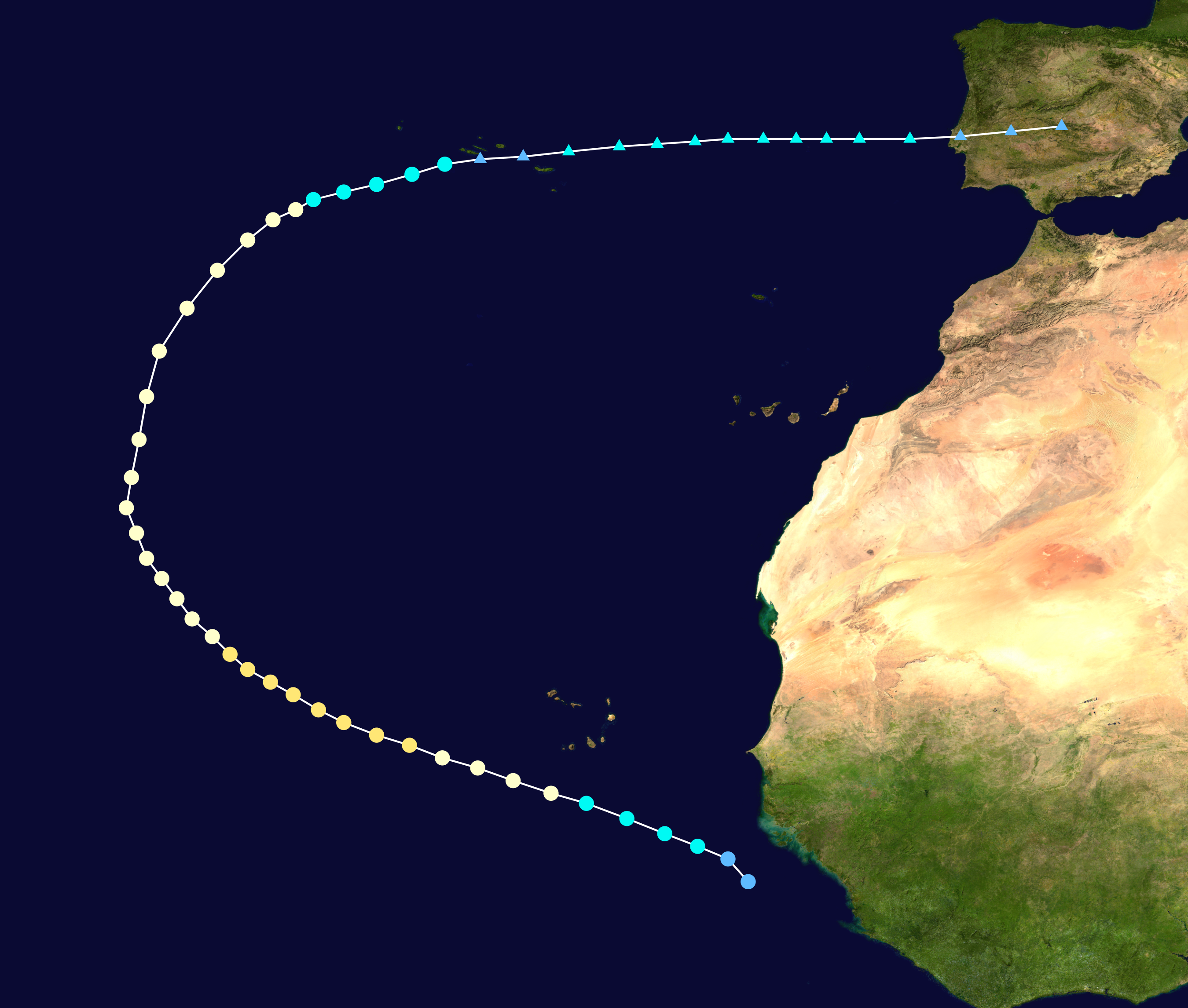
Storm path of Hurricane Jeanne

- 00:00 UTC (8:00 p.m. EDT, September 22) at 18.8°N 70.8°W – Hurricane Georges weakens to Category 1 intensity about 65 mi (100 km) west-northwest of Santo Domingo, and later emerges over the Windward Passage.
- 12:00 UTC (8:00 a.m. AST) at 33.3°N 65.4°W – Tropical Depression Eleven forms from a small low-pressure area about 80 mi (130 km) north-northwest of Bermuda.
- 18:00 UTC (2:00 p.m. AST) at 29.6°N 40.2°W – Tropical Storm Ivan strengthens into a Category 1 hurricane about 930 mi (1,500 km) southwest of the Azores.
- 18:00 UTC (2:00 p.m. AST) at 15.0°N 30.8°W – Hurricane Jeanne strengthens to Category 2 intensity about 470 mi (760 km) west of Cape Verde.
- 21:30 UTC (5:30 p.m. EDT) at 20.1°N 74.5°W – Hurricane Georges makes its fifth landfall about 40 mi (65 km) east of Guantanamo Bay, Cuba, with maximum sustained winds of 75 mph (120 km/h) and a central pressure of 993 mbar (29.32 inHg).

September 24

- 00:00 UTC (8:00 p.m. AST, September 23) at 33.2°N 60.7°W – Tropical Depression Eleven strengthens into Tropical Storm Karl about 240 mi (390 km) east-northeast of Bermuda.
- 18:00 UTC (2:00 p.m. AST) at 17.0°N 35.4°W – Hurricane Jeanne attains its peak intensity, with maximum sustained winds of 105 mph (165 km/h) and a minimum central pressure of 969 mbar (28.61 inHg), about 785 mi (1,260 km) west of Cape Verde.

September 25

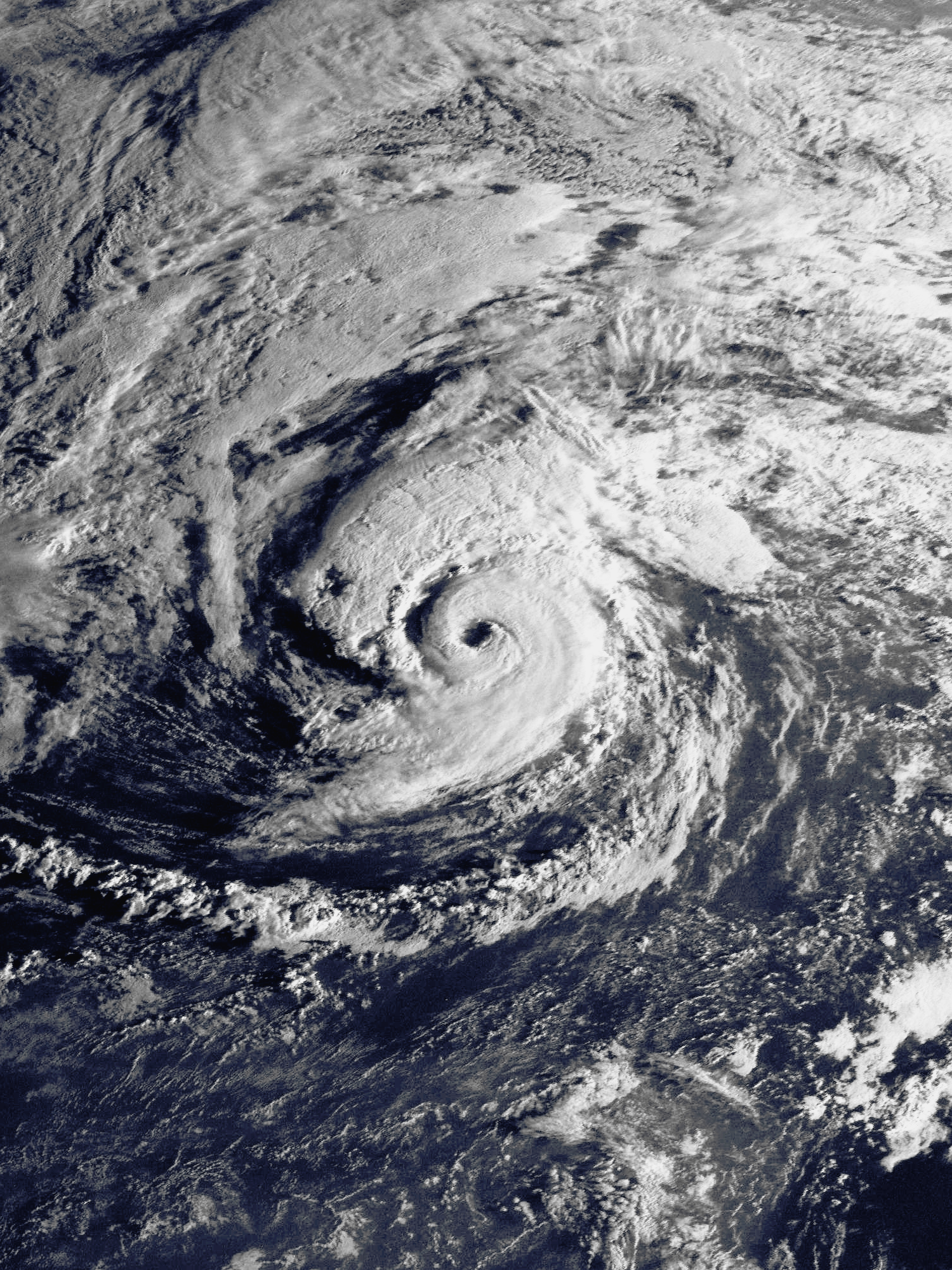
Hurricane Ivan near peak intensity on September 26

- 00:00 UTC (8:00 p.m. EDT, September 24) at 22.7°N 79.0°W – Hurricane Georges is located over the Straits of Florida about 220 mi (350 km) southeast of Key West, Florida, having recently emerged off the northern coast of Cuba.
- 06:00 UTC (2:00 a.m. EDT) at 23.4°N 80.2°W – Hurricane Georges restrengthens to Category 2 intensity about 125 mi (205 km) southeast of Key West.
- 12:00 UTC (2:00 p.m. AST) at 30.4°N 54.0°W – Tropical Storm Karl strengthens into a Category 1 hurricane about 645 mi (1,035 km) east of Bermuda.
- 15:30 UTC (11:30 a.m. EDT) at 24.5°N 81.8°W – Hurricane Georges makes its sixth landfall on Key West with maximum sustained winds of 105 mph (165 km/h) and a central pressure of 981 mbar (28.97 inHg).
- 18:00 UTC (2:00 p.m. AST) at 19.3°N 38.6°W – Hurricane Jeanne weakens to Category 1 intensity about 1,020 mi (1,640 km) west-northwest of Cape Verde.

September 26

- 06:00 UTC (2:00 a.m. AST) at 39.2°N 36.3°W – Hurricane Ivan attains its peak intensity, with maximum sustained winds of 90 mph (150 km/h) and a minimum central pressure of 975 mbar (28.79 inHg), about 445 mi (715 km) west of the Azores.

September 27

- 00:00 UTC (8:00 p.m. AST, September 26) at 40.7°N 25.7°W – Hurricane Ivan weakens into a tropical storm about 190 mi (305 km) northeast of the Azores.
- 00:00 UTC (8:00 p.m. AST, September 26) at 33.9°N 47.3°W – Hurricane Karl strengthens to Category 2 intensity about 1,015 mi (1,630 km) east of Bermuda. It simultaneously attains its peak intensity, with maximum sustained winds of 105 mph (165 km/h) and a minimum central pressure of 970 mbar (28.64 inHg).
- 06:00 UTC (2:00 a.m. AST) at 40.9°N 22.7°W – Tropical Storm Ivan transitions into an extratropical cyclone about 320 mi (520 km) east-northeast of the Azores, and later dissipates.
- 12:00 UTC (8:00 a.m. AST) at 37.4°N 42.5°W – Hurricane Karl weakens to Category 1 intensity about 625 mi (1,010 km) west of Flores Island, Azores.

September 28

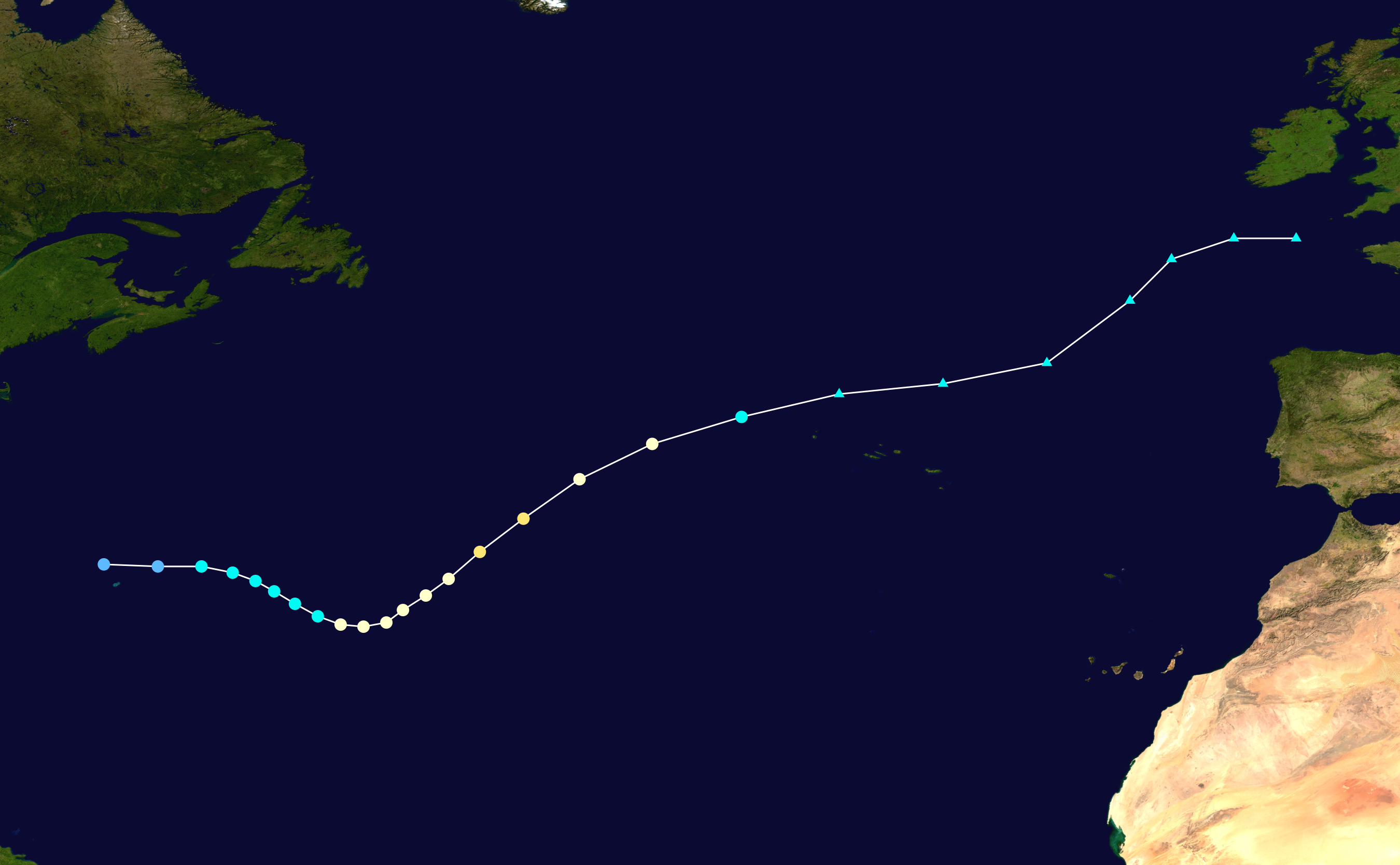
Storm path of Hurricane Karl

- 00:00 UTC (8:00 p.m. AST, September 27) at 40.4°N 34.7°W – Hurricane Karl weakens into a tropical storm about 195 mi (315 km) west-northwest of Flores Island.
- 06:00 UTC (2:00 a.m. AST) at 41.5°N 30.0°W – Tropical Storm Karl transitions into an extratropical cyclone about 155 mi (250 km) north-northeast of Flores Island, and later dissipates south of Ireland.
- 11:30 UTC (6:30 a.m. CDT) at 30.4°N 88.9°W – Hurricane Georges makes its seventh and final landfall near Biloxi, Mississippi, with maximum sustained winds of 105 mph (165 km/h) and a central pressure of 964 mbar (28.47 inHg).
- 18:00 UTC (1:00 p.m. CDT) at 30.6°N 88.9°W – Hurricane Georges weakens to Category 1 intensity over land just north of Biloxi.

September 29

- 00:00 UTC (7:00 p.m. CDT, September 28) at 30.6°N 89.0°W – Hurricane Georges weakens into a tropical storm over land just north-northwest of Biloxi.
- 12:00 UTC (7:00 a.m. CDT) at 31.0°N 88.1°W – Tropical Storm Georges weakens into a tropical depression over land about 25 mi (35 km) north of Mobile, Alabama.
- 18:00 UTC (2:00 p.m. AST) at 36.6°N 34.6°W – Hurricane Jeanne weakens into a tropical storm about 350 mi (565 km) west-southwest of Horta, Azores.

=== October ===
October 1

- 00:00 UTC (8:00 p.m. AST, September 30) at 38.2°N 28.0°W – Tropical Storm Jeanne weakens into a tropical depression about 45 mi (75 km) southwest of Horta.
- 06:00 UTC (2:00 a.m. AST) at 38.3°N 26.3°W – Tropical Depression Jeanne transitions into an extratropical cyclone about 130 mi (215 km) east of Horta, and later dissipates over Spain.
- 12:00 UTC (8:00 a.m. EDT) at 30.5°N 81.8°W – Tropical Depression Georges is last noted as a tropical cyclone near where the Florida–Georgia border meets the Atlantic Ocean, dissipating shortly thereafter.

October 5

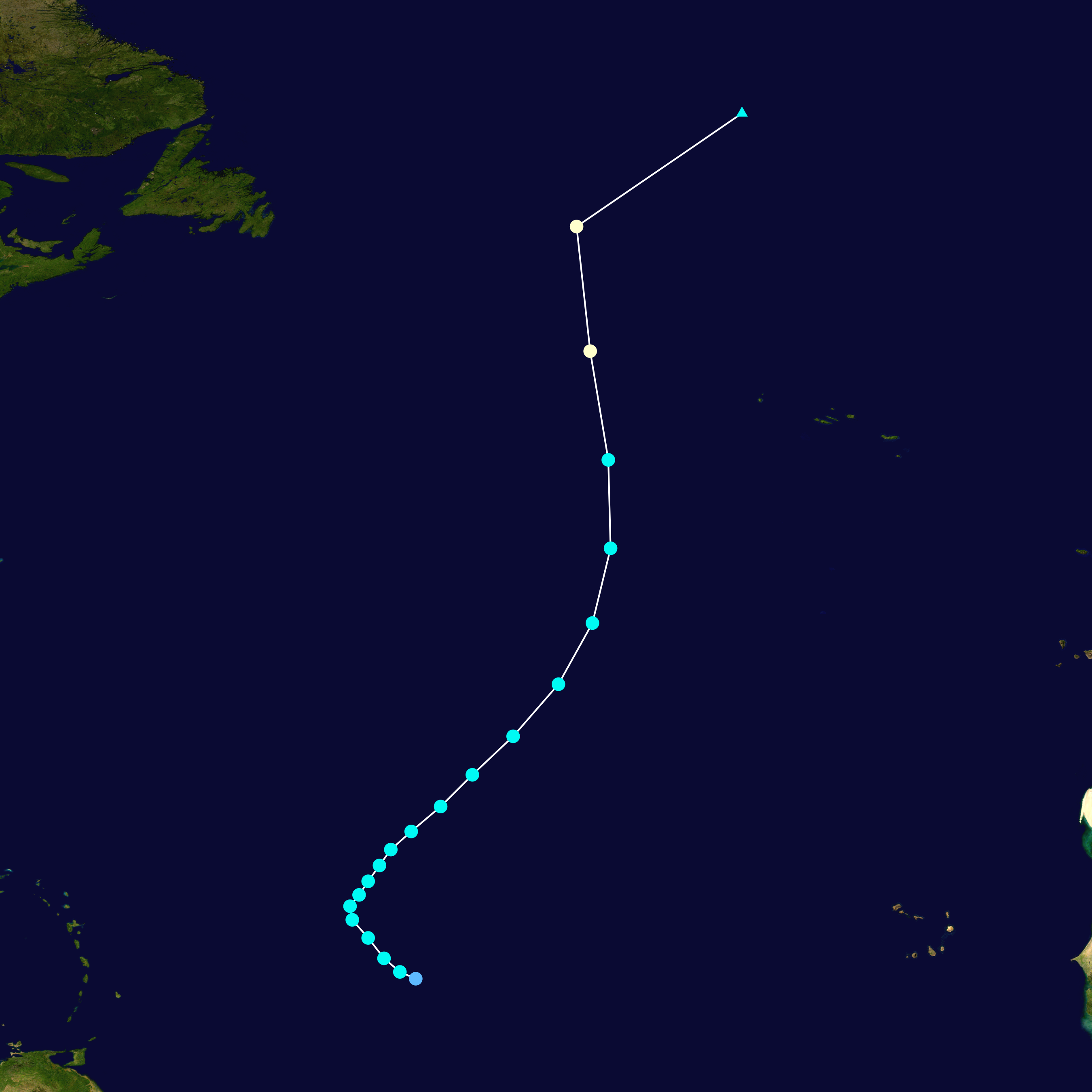
Storm path of Hurricane Lisa

- 00:00 UTC (8:00 p.m. AST, October 4) at 13.9°N 46.4°W – The twelfth tropical depression of the season forms from a tropical wave about 885 mi (1,425 km) east of Barbados.
- 06:00 UTC (2:00 a.m. AST) at 14.2°N 47.1°W – The twelfth tropical depression of the season strengthens into Tropical Storm Lisa about 840 mi (1,350 km) east of Barbados.

October 9

- 12:00 UTC (8:00 a.m. AST) at 41.6°N 38.7°W – Tropical Storm Lisa strengthens into a Category 1 hurricane about 420 mi (675 km) west-northwest of Flores Island. It simultaneously attains its peak intensity, with maximum sustained winds of 75 mph (120 km/h) and a minimum central pressure of 995 mbar (29.38 inHg).

October 10

- 00:00 UTC (8:00 p.m. AST, October 9) at 52.1°N 32.0°W – Hurricane Lisa weakens to storm force and transitions into an extratropical cyclone about 875 mi (1,410 km) north of Flores Island, dissipating shortly thereafter.

October 22

- 00:00 UTC (8:00 p.m. EDT, October 21) at 11.6°N 76.1°W – Tropical Depression Thirteen forms from a tropical wave about 445 mi (715 km) south of Kingston, Jamaica.
- 18:00 UTC (2:00 p.m. EDT) at 11.6°N 77.9°W – Tropical Depression Thirteen strengthens into Tropical Storm Mitch about 265 mi (425 km) east-southeast of San Andrés Island, Colombia.

October 24

- 06:00 UTC (2:00 a.m. EDT) at 13.9°N 77.8°W – Tropical Storm Mitch strengthens into a Category 1 hurricane about 275 mi (445 km) east-northeast of San Andrés Island.
- 18:00 UTC (2:00 p.m. EDT) at 15.0°N 78.1°W – Hurricane Mitch strengthens to Category 2 intensity about 225 mi (360 km) south-southwest of Kingston.

October 25

- 00:00 UTC (8:00 p.m. EDT, October 24) at 15.5°N 78.4°W – Hurricane Mitch strengthens to Category 3 intensity about 200 mi (325 km) south-southwest of Kingston.
- 12:00 UTC (7:00 a.m. EST) (Note: Daylight saving time ended on October 25, 1998. At 2:00 a.m. EDT, clocks were moved back to 1:00 a.m. EST.) at 16.2°N 79.6°W – Hurricane Mitch strengthens to Category 4 intensity about 225 mi (360 km) southwest of Kingston.

October 26

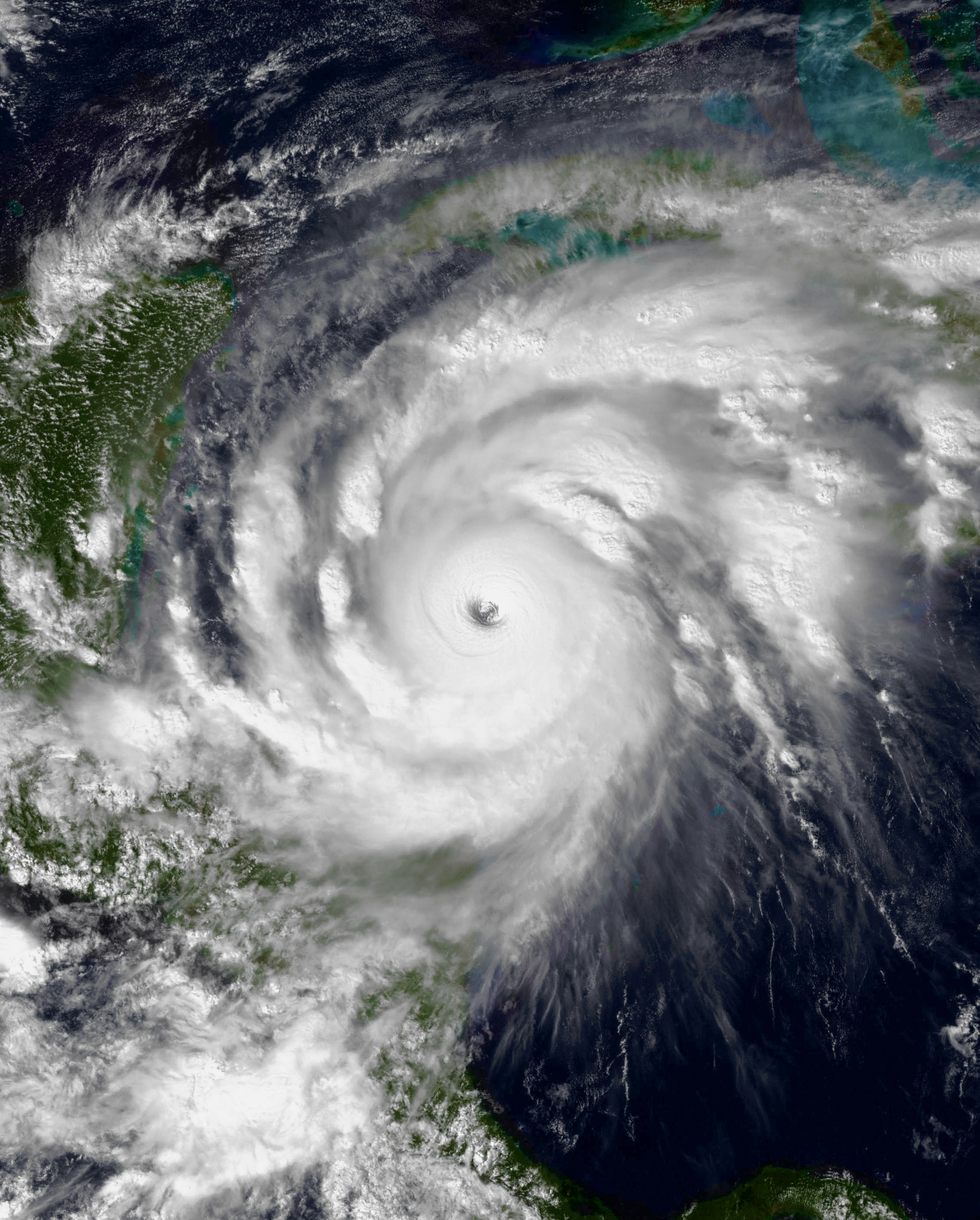
Hurricane Mitch near peak intensity on October 26

- 12:00 UTC (7:00 a.m. EST) at 16.6°N 82.6°W – Hurricane Mitch strengthens to Category 5 intensity about 105 mph (165 km/h) southeast of the Swan Islands of Honduras.
- 18:00 UTC (1:00 p.m. EST) at 16.9°N 83.1°W – Hurricane Mitch attains its peak intensity, with maximum sustained winds of 180 mph (285 km/h) and a minimum central pressure of 905 mbar (26.72 inHg), about 65 mi (100 km) southeast of the Swan Islands, making it the strongest storm of the season.

October 28

- 06:00 UTC (1:00 a.m. EST) at 16.3°N 85.6°W – Hurricane Mitch weakens to Category 4 intensity about 25 mi (35 km) east-southeast of the Honduran island of Guanaja.
- 18:00 UTC (1:00 p.m. EST) at 16.3°N 85.7°W – Hurricane Mitch rapidly weakens to Category 2 intensity about 15 mi (30 km) southeast of Guanaja.

October 29

- 06:00 UTC (1:00 a.m. EST) at 16.1°N 85.8°W – Hurricane Mitch weakens to Category 1 intensity about 30 mi (45 km) south of Guanaja.
- 12:00 UTC (7:00 a.m. EST) at 15.9°N 85.7°W – Hurricane Mitch makes its first landfall just west of Limón, Honduras, or about 75 mi (120 km) east of La Ceiba, with maximum sustained winds of 80 mph (130 km/h) and a central pressure of 987 mbar (29.15 inHg).
- 18:00 UTC (1:00 p.m. EST) at 15.8°N 85.6°W – Hurricane Mitch weakens into a tropical storm just inland from the coast just southwest of Limón.

October 31

- 18:00 UTC (12:00 p.m. CST) at 14.6°N 89.2°W – Tropical Storm Mitch weakens into a tropical depression over land near the point where the borders of Honduras, El Salvador, and Guatemala all meet.

=== November ===
November 2

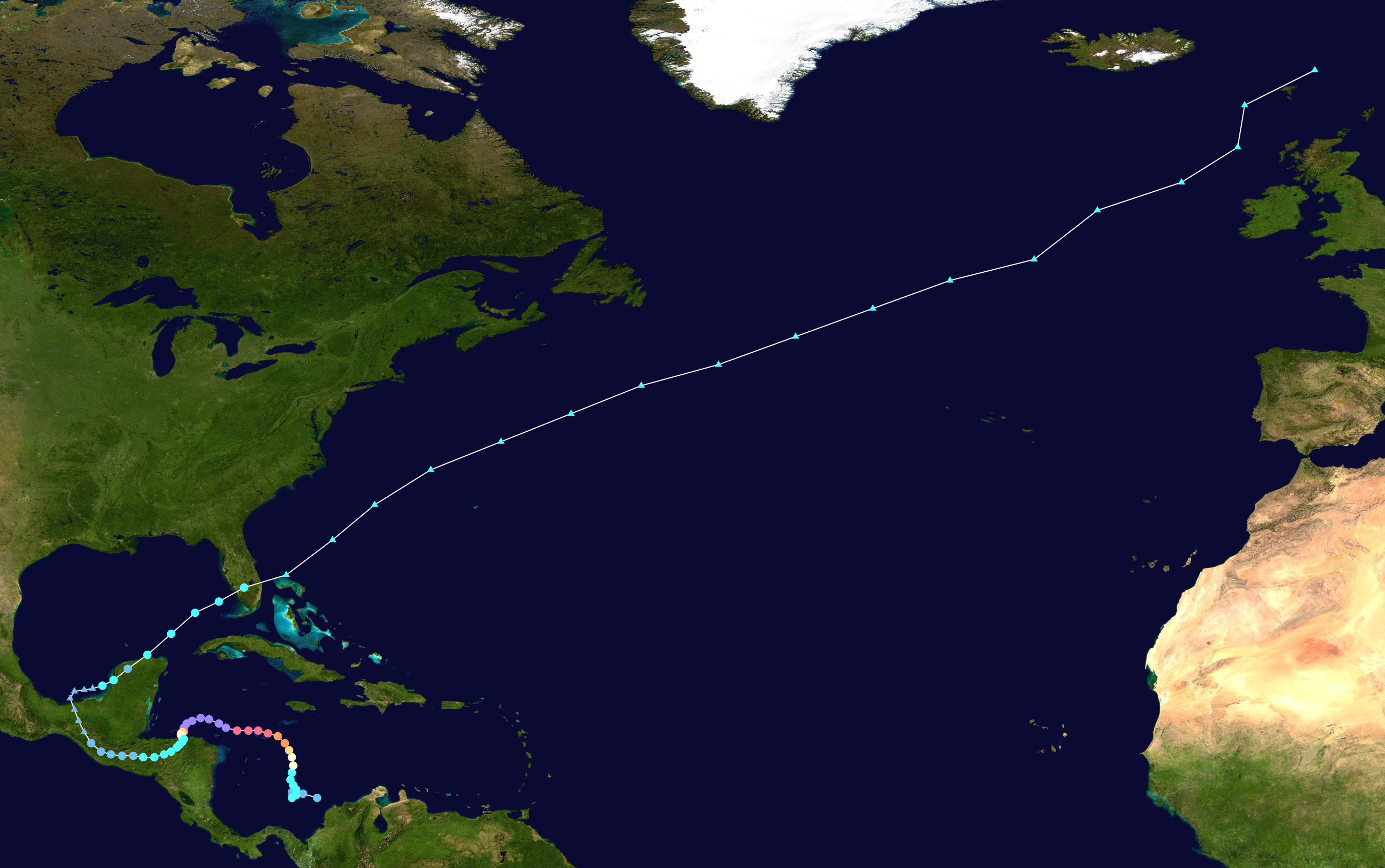
Storm path of Hurricane Mitch

- 00:00 UTC (6:00 p.m. CST, November 1) at 16.3°N 92.7°W – Tropical Depression Mitch dissipates over southeastern Mexico about 175 mi (280 km) south-southwest of Ciudad del Carmen, Campeche.

November 3

- 18:00 UTC (12:00 p.m. CST) at 19.6°N 91.4°W – The remnants of Hurricane Mitch regenerate into a tropical storm over the Bay of Campeche about 75 mi (120 km) north-northeast of Ciudad del Carmen.

November 4

- 02:00 UTC (8:00 p.m. CST, November 3) at 20.1°N 90.5°W – Tropical Storm Mitch makes its second landfall about 15 miles (30 km) north-northeast of Campeche, Campeche, with maximum sustained winds of 40 mph (65 km/h) and a central pressure of 998 mbar (29.47 inHg).
- 06:00 UTC (12:00 a.m. CST) at 20.8°N 89.6°W – Tropical Storm Mitch weakens into a tropical depression over the Yucatán Peninsula about 85 mi (140 km) northeast of Campeche.
- 12:00 UTC (6:00 a.m. CST) at 21.8°N 88.2°W – Tropical Depression Mitch restrengthens into a tropical storm over the Gulf of Mexico about 105 mi (165 km) east-northeast of Progreso, Yucatán.

November 5

- 11:00 UTC (6:00 a.m. EST) at 26.2°N 81.9°W – Tropical Storm Mitch makes its third and final landfall about 5 mi (10 km) west of Naples, Florida, with maximum sustained winds of 65 mph (100 km/h) and a central pressure of 989 mbar (29.21 inHg).
- 18:00 UTC (1:00 p.m. EST) at 27.5°N 78.3°W – Tropical Storm Mitch transitions into an extratropical cyclone off the east coast of Florida about 120 mi (195 km) east-northeast of Jupiter, and later dissipates.

November 24

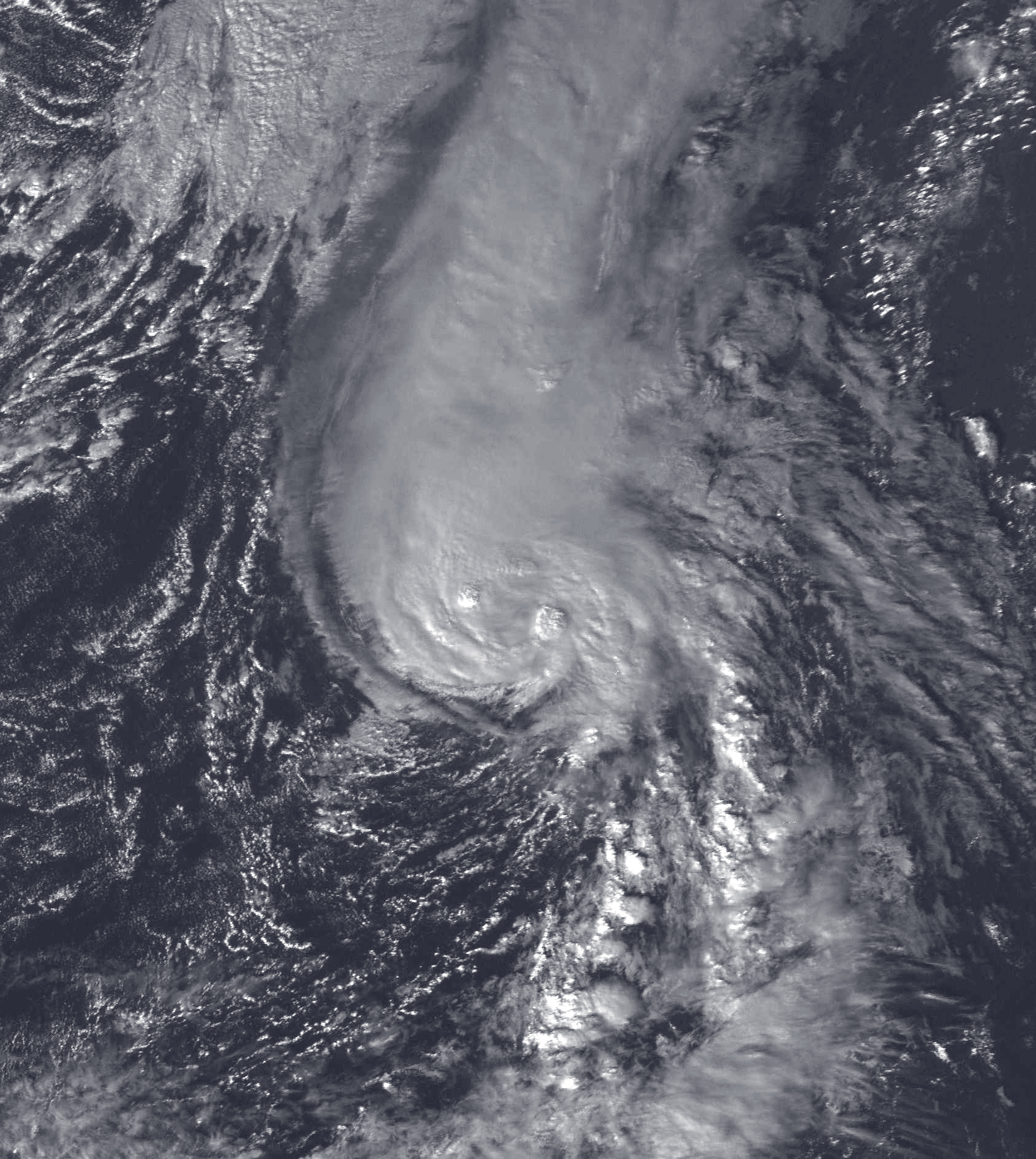
Hurricane Nicole to the southwest of the Azores on November 30

- 00:00 UTC (8:00 p.m. AST, November 23) at 28.3°N 28.0°W – The fourteenth tropical depression of the season forms from a strong frontal low-pressure area about 750 mi (1,205 km) west of the Canary Islands.
- 06:00 UTC (2:00 a.m. AST) at 27.9°N 29.1°W – The fourteenth tropical depression of the season strengthens into Tropical Storm Nicole about 810 mi (1,305 km) west of the Canary Islands.

November 26

- 12:00 UTC (8:00 a.m. AST) at 25.3°N 37.3°W – Tropical Storm Nicole weakens into a tropical depression about 1,070 mi (1,720 km) southwest of the Azores.

November 27

- 18:00 UTC (2:00 p.m. AST) at 25.6°N 43.0°W – Tropical Depression Nicole restrengthens into a tropical storm about 1,255 mi (2,020 km) southwest of the Azores.

November 30

- 00:00 UTC (8:00 p.m. AST, November 29) at 32.6°N 42.6°W – Tropical Storm Nicole strengthens into a Category 1 hurricane about 915 mi (1,470 km) west-southwest of the Azores.
- The 1998 Atlantic hurricane season officially ends.

=== December ===
December 1

- 00:00 UTC (8:00 p.m. AST, November 30) at 35.1°N 37.9°W – Hurricane Nicole attains its peak intensity, with maximum sustained winds of 85 mph (140 km/h) and a minimum central pressure of 979 mbar (28.91 inHg), about 600 mi (965 km) west-southwest of the Azores.
- 12:00 UTC (8:00 a.m. AST) at 40.4°N 34.0°W – Hurricane Nicole weakens into a tropical storm about 340 mi (545 km) west-northwest of the Azores.
- 18:00 UTC (2:00 p.m. AST) at 43.0°N 34.0°W – Tropical Storm Nicole transitions into an extratropical cyclone about 430 mi (695 km) northwest of the Azores, and later dissipates.

== See also ==
- Timeline of the 1998 Pacific hurricane season
- Lists of Atlantic hurricanes
