= Mish Mish, Akkar =

Mishmish (مشمش (عكار))
- Village
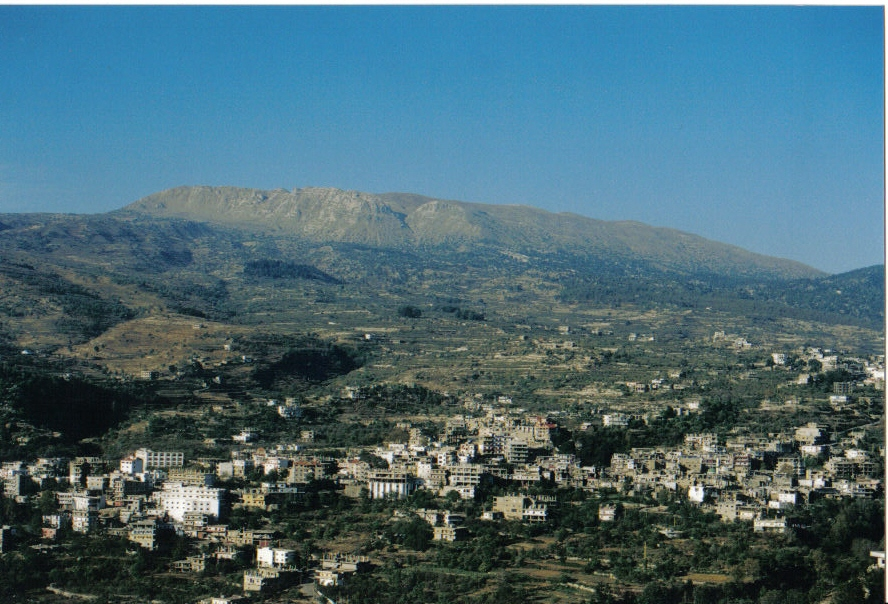
- Village of Mishmish

- Location in Lebanon
- Coordinates: 34°28′20″N 36°10′13″E
- Country: Lebanon
- Governorate: Akkar
- District: Akkar

Area
  - Total: 1.458 sq mi (3.777 km^{2})
- Elevation: 3,300 ft (1,000 m)
- Time zone: UTC+2 (EET)
  - Summer (DST): +3

Mishmish (Arabic: مشمش), also spelled Michmich, is a village located in Akkar Governorate, Lebanon. Mishmish is situated 1100 metres above sea level in the mountainous terrain of the north. The closest major city to the village is Tripoli 45 km to the west; the Lebanese capital Beirut is 129 km to the southwest.

== History ==
The Akkar region was first inhabited by the Phoenicians but the original settlers of the Mishmish village built mud brick homes around the mosque to stay close for prayers and also safety as there were plentiful dangerous wild animals such as hyenas that roamed the surrounding valleys and mountains. A few of the original mud brick homes are still standing near the village mosque. The village has seen many foreign occupiers pass through its lands such as the Crusaders, Ottoman Turks and the French colonial forces. Reminders of the area's past still exist in ruins around Mishmish including road directions carved into rock, dirt roads used by invading forces and small castles or homes used by rulers. The most notable located 15 km away near the village of Old Akkar built in the late 10th century A.D. by Mouhriz Ibn Akkar, the castle was taken by the Crusaders in the 12th century and reconquered in 1271 by the Mamluk Sultan Baibars. During the Ottoman period, it belonged to the Kurdish feudal family the Banu Sayfa, then around 1620 it was partially destroyed by Emir Fakhreddine II. Husseins originated in this place.

In 1838, Eli Smith noted Mushmish as a Sunni Muslim village, located south of esh-Sheikh Muhammed.

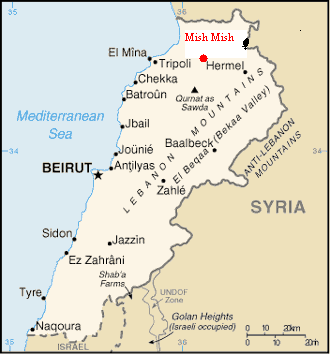

== Geography ==
Mishmish is blessed with a surplus supply of fresh water compared to the majority of middle eastern countries. Major springs that offer water to the village are Abou Ali, Safsafa, Hawr, Tamima, Abou Moustafa, Ghaba, Abou sara sources. Springs used to water the lands are Ghasam, Hachem, Abour Richa, and the Deleb source. Mishmish soil is arable and rocky. There are two main roads that connect the village to the coast with other regional roads that connect the regions villages together. There are numerous old dirt and rocky roads that still connect to the coast, regional villages and Syria.

== Climate ==
The temperature ranges from -10 in the winter months to 35 °C during summer. Mishmish receives heavy rain and snow during the winter. During the winter at times roads to and around the village are inaccessible.

== Agriculture ==
Although mishmish translates to apricot in Arabic, local farmers predominantly produce apples, pears and seeds.

== Food ==
Mish Mish is known for its Lebanese foods and beverages. Animal meats such as Beef, Lamb and chicken are main staples of the residents. Communal wood fired bread ovens exist in certain places of the village.

== Population ==
In the past few decades thousands of people have migrated from Mishmish to Australia to commence a new life, this has resulted in a fairly large community being established in the Western Suburbs of Melbourne, Victoria. The Mishmish people living in Australia initially commenced working in factories.

== Religion ==
The main religion of the village is Sunni islam.

== See also ==
- List of cities in Lebanon

== Bibliography ==
- Robinson, E.; Smith, E. (1841). Biblical Researches in Palestine, Mount Sinai and Arabia Petraea: A Journal of Travels in the year 1838. Vol. 3. Boston: Crocker & Brewster.
