= Microsoft Popfly =

Defunct mashup website

- Website type: Rich web application editor
- Available in: English
- Owner: Microsoft Corporation
- Creator: Microsoft Corporation
- Commercial: Yes
- Registration: Through Windows Live ID
- Launched: May 18, 2007
- Current status: Discontinued

Microsoft Popfly (internally codenamed Springfield) was a Website that allowed users to create web pages, program snippets, and mashups using the Microsoft Silverlight rich web applications runtime and the set of online tools provided. It was discontinued on August 24, 2009.

== Tools ==
The Popfly included four tools based on Silverlight technology, which are described as follows.

=== Game Creator ===
The Game Creator was a tool that allowed you to create your own game or extend a game already built. It could be exported to Facebook, or be used as a Windows Live Gadget.

=== Mashup Creator ===
The Mashup Creator was a tool that let users fit together pre-built blocks in order to mash together different web services and visualization tools. For example, a user could join together photo and map blocks in order to get a geotagged map of pictures on a topic of their choice. An advanced view for blocks allowed users to modify the code of the block in JavaScript, as well as giving users flexibility in designing the programs. Additional HTML code could also be added to the mashups. A feature similar to IntelliSense, with autocompletion of HTML code, was available as well.

The Mashup Creator also provided a preview function, with live preview in the background as users link blocks. Tutorials were available, and error notices were given to users when incompatible data was sent between blocks.

=== Web Creator ===
Popfly Web Page creator

The Web Creator was a tool for creating Web pages. The user interface layout was similar to the ribbon user interface for Office 2007. Web pages were created without HTML coding, and could be customized by choosing predefined themes, styles, and color schemes. Users could embed their shared mashups in the Web page. Completed Web pages could also be saved in each user's Popfly space.

=== Popfly Space ===
Popfly Mashup creator

Completed mashups and Web pages were stored on Popfly Space (100 MB maximum per user), where users also received a customizable profile page and other social networking features. Public projects could be shared, rated, or "ripped" by other users. Popfly allowed users to download mashups as gadgets for Windows Sidebar or embed them into Windows Live Spaces, with some support for other blog service providers.

Another feature of Popfly Space was the Popfly Explorer plug-in for Visual Studio Express. Users could utilize Visual Studio Express (Visual Studio 2005 Express Editions or higher required) to download the mashups and modify the coding, as well as perform actions such as uploading, sharing, ripping, and rating the mashups.

=== Shutdown ===
On July 16, 2009, the Popfly team announced that the Popfly service would be discontinued on August 24, 2009.

All sites, references, and resources of popfly were taken down, and this product is considered defunct.

== See also ==
- Mashup
- Google Mashup Editor (Deprecated, since January 14, 2009)
- WSO2 Mashup Server
- Mozilla Ubiquity
- Mozilla Jetpack
- Yahoo! Pipes
- Yahoo! query language
- Scratch programming language
- EMML
- Open Mashup Alliance
