= Edge data integration =

An edge data integration is an implementation of data integration technology undertaken in an ad hoc or tactical fashion. This is also sometimes referred to as point-to-point integration because it connects two types of data directly to serve a narrow purpose. Many edge integrations, and actually the vast majority of all data integration, involve hand-coded scripts. Some may take the form of Business Mashups (web application hybrids), Rich Internet applications, or other browser-based models that take advantage of Web 2.0 technologies to combine data in a Web browser.

Examples of edge data integration projects might be:

- extracting a list of customers from a host Sales Force Automation application and writing the results to an Excel spreadsheet
- creating a script-driven framework for managing RSS feeds
- combining data from a weather website, a shipping company's website, and a company's internal logistics database to track shipments and estimated arrival times of packages

It has been claimed that edge data integration do not typically require large budgets and centrally managed technologies, which is in contrast to a core data integration.

== See also ==
- core data integration
- Business Mashups
- Rich Internet application
- Web 2.0
- Yahoo! Pipes
- Microsoft Popfly
- IBM Mashup Center
