= OpenAjax Alliance =

Industry group devoted to Ajax

The OpenAjax Alliance is an industry group dedicated to the set of technologies and web programming techniques known as Ajax.

== History and Termination of Formal Operations ==
In late 2005, under the leadership of IBM, a number of companies came together to discuss how to ensure that Ajax reaches its full potential as the industry standard application platform based on open technologies. These initial discussions led to the announcement of the "OpenAjax Initiative" on Feb. 1, 2006, with participation from 15 original companies, including BEA, Borland, the Dojo Foundation, Eclipse Foundation, Google, IBM, Laszlo Systems, Mozilla Corporation, Novell, Openwave Systems, Oracle, Red Hat, Yahoo, Zend, and Zimbra.

Between February 1 and May 15, 2006, an additional 15 organizations joined "OpenAjax", and the group of 30 companies held a two-day kickoff meeting in San Francisco to establish their plans. During the meeting, the decision was made to form the OpenAjax Alliance, define its mission, agree on an interim organizational process, and establish its activities.

The participating companies then developed a governance model through a Members Agreement and began executing their marketing, educational and technical initiatives. The alliance's website and white paper were launched in September 2006. In October 2006, the alliance elected its first Steering Committee. By December 2006, the alliance had released its first technical product, the OpenAjax Hub, with a draft specification and reference open-source implementation. The OpenAjax Hub integrated a dozen Ajax toolkits on a trial basis as part of the alliance's initial OpenAjax InteropFest.

As of May 2008, the organization had over 100 member organizations, including major companies such as IBM, Microsoft, Google, Adobe, and Sun, as well as Ajax suppliers like the Dojo Foundation, Laszlo Systems, Nexaweb, Tibco, Zimbra, and a few individual members.

In October 2012, the OpenAjax Alliance formally concluded its operations.

== Members ==
The OpenAjax Alliance experienced steady growth in its membership. To view the complete list of members, please visit the OpenAjax Alliance homepage or the members' wiki page.

The alliance's members include organizations from various categories:

- Ajax toolkit developers (both open source and commercial)
- Web browsers (both desktop and mobile)
- Enterprise product companies
- Organizations that utilize Ajax to provide solutions to their users
- Other community-oriented organizations, including open source projects or standards organizations, with a significant interest in Ajax.

== How OpenAjax Alliance is organized ==
=== Steering Committee ===
The OpenAjax Alliance members elect representatives from seven companies to serve on the OpenAjax Alliance Steering Committee. The Steering Committee is responsible for overseeing the operations of the OpenAjax Alliance on behalf of its member organizations. One of its key responsibilities is providing final approval for the establishment of working groups and the development of specifications, among other matters.

=== Working Groups ===
The OpenAjax Alliance develops formal materials through its Working Groups. Currently, there are two formally chartered working groups that operate according to the alliance's established process documents.

The Interoperability Working Group focuses on technical activities related to Ajax interoperability, particularly on client-side runtime issues. The group's primary deliverables include specifications that define OpenAjax Conformance in detail, such as the OpenAjax Hub specifications (versions 1.0 and 1.1), as well as the management of the OpenAjax Registry.

The Marketing Working Group is responsible for the OpenAjax Alliance's communication, education, and promotion efforts. Its main objective is to promote the adoption of open and interoperable Ajax-based Web technologies. The group produces white papers, oversees website development, and drives the strategy, high-level definition, and industry adoption of the OpenAjax Conformance term.

The IDE Working Group focuses on developing metadata standards that enable integration of various Ajax runtime libraries into different Ajax developer tools, specifically integrated development environments (IDEs). The group's metadata standard, known as the OpenAjax Metadata Specification, also serves as an industry standard for mashup widgets. The standard aims to be an intermediary format that closely aligns with popular proprietary formats, allowing for transcoding to and from the OpenAjax format. This approach ensures that support for the metadata formats is not necessary for every industry participant.

=== Task Forces ===
The OpenAjax Alliance establishes task forces to explore new areas of activity. These task forces consist of informal groups of members who conduct research and provide recommendations for future alliance initiatives. Currently, there are four task forces in place:

1. The Security Task Force focuses on identifying Ajax security issues and determining the appropriate actions for the alliance to undertake.
2. The Mobile Ajax Task Force investigates ways in which the OpenAjax Alliance can promote the adoption of Ajax applications on mobile devices and support developers in achieving success in this domain.
3. The Gadgets Task Force collaborates with the IDE Working Group to ensure that the OpenAjax Metadata Specification meets the needs of the mashup community and serves as an industry standard for mashup widgets.
4. The Runtime Advocacy Task Force utilizes an open wiki platform to gather input from the Ajax community. Their goal is to compile a prioritized feature request list that reflects the most significant needs of the Ajax industry with regard to future web browsers.

== Specifications and open source ==
While the OpenAjax Alliance does not aim to become a formal standards body, it does actively engage in activities related to standards when necessary to achieve goals of enhanced interoperability, increased vendor choice, and the promotion of innovation. Consequently, the alliance may develop its own formal specifications or contribute to open-source projects to address significant gaps in the industry. The ultimate objective in such cases is to transition the work to a formal standards organization or an open-source project when the time is deemed appropriate.

Members of the OpenAjax Alliance are encouraged to participate in standards-related activities within other standards bodies and open-source projects. This collaboration helps to expedite the coordinated progress of OpenAjax technologies and products.

== OpenAjax Conformance ==
A fundamental aspect of OpenAjax Alliance's work revolves around defining OpenAjax Conformance. OpenAjax Conformance refers to the set of requirements that the alliance imposes on Ajax technologies, products, and applications. By utilizing Ajax products that adhere to OpenAjax Conformance, IT managers and web developers can benefit from the following:

1. Seamless integration of multiple Ajax products and technologies within the same web application, particularly in applications employing mashup techniques.
2. Increased confidence in product choices, as OpenAjax Conformance plays a comparable role in the Ajax community to that of the Good Housekeeping Seal in the consumer products realm.
3. Reduced training and development costs, as well as expedited delivery of Web 2.0 innovations, due to the adoption of common approaches built upon OpenAjax standards within the industry.
4. Interchangeability of OpenAjax Conformant products, enabling customers to select from various vendors.

For an Ajax product to achieve OpenAjax Conformance, it must fulfill the following criteria:

1. Support the OpenAjax Hub.
2. Register its library and JavaScript global objects with the OpenAjax Registry.
3. Comply with all relevant Conformance Requirements outlined in the collection of specifications provided by the OpenAjax Alliance.

== OpenAjax hub ==
The OpenAjax Hub is a compact collection of JavaScript technologies designed to fulfill essential requirements for Ajax runtime interoperability. The initial release, OpenAjax Hub 1.0, incorporates the following capabilities:

1. Ajax library loading
2. An event hub based on the publish/subscribe model (topic bus)

The upcoming version, OpenAjax Hub 2.0, aims to expand the publish/subscribe functionalities to facilitate secure mashup workflows and client-server communications. In the context of mashups, Hub 2.0 enables the confinement of mashup widgets within secure sandboxes while offering a facilitated message bus.

The OpenAjax Alliance is responsible for developing the OpenAjax Hub Specification and provides an open-source reference implementation.

== See also ==
- Open Mashup Alliance
- graceful degradation
- Progressive enhancement
- EMML
