= Pipelining =

Pipelining may refer to:

- Pipeline (computing), aka a data pipeline, a set of data processing elements connected in series
  - Protocol pipelining, a technique in which multiple requests are written out to a single socket without waiting for the corresponding responses
  - HTTP pipelining, a technique in which multiple HTTP requests are sent on a single TCP connection
  - Instruction pipelining, a technique for implementing instruction-level parallelism within a single processor
- Pipelining (DSP implementation), a transformation for optimizing digital circuit
- Pipeline transport, long-distance transportation of a liquid or gas through a system of pipes

== See also ==
- Pipeline (disambiguation)
