= IBM Lotus Mashups =

Lotus Mashups is a business mashups editor developed and distributed by IBM as part of the IBM Mashup Center system. Lotus Mashups is intended for use in professional environments, such as corporations and governments.

== Features ==
=== Interface ===
Lotus Mashups is a self-contained web application, requiring no external software to develop mashup applications. Mashups uses the Dojo framework for Web 2.0 functionality.

=== Integration with Websphere Portal ===
Lotus Mashups has the ability to integrate portlets into mashup projects. This is accomplished either by importing a portlet from a connected Websphere Portal server, or by uploading a .WAR file.

=== Security ===
In an effort to thwart unauthorized access of sensitive data by externally created widgets, all widgets are self-contained and isolated, unable to pass code back and forth unless specifically enabled by the mashup author.

== InfoSphere MashupHub ==
The data and administration counterpart of Lotus Mashups, InfoSphere MashupHub is utilized for the following tasks:

- Creating new widgets using data feeds
- Housing a catalog of user-created widgets
- Acting as catalyst for community collaboration

== Consumer use ==
Although Lotus Greenhouse allows users to use Lotus Mashups free of charge, purchase of IBM Mashup Center is required for private collaboration. Consequently, the consumer market would likely find Lotus Mashups to be cost-prohibitive.

== See also ==
- Mashup (web application hybrid)
