= MashApps =

Process-centric cloud application

MashApps are process-centric cloud applications for small and medium enterprises and departmental deployments. MashApps can be used to solve different types of business problems within an enterprise. Integrations with third-party applications, both on-premises and on-demand systems can be modeled without much dependency on the IT team. Mashup applications can be shared between users or organizations.

Users looking for MashApps for their business scenarios can either build it themselves or look for similar solutions that are readily available on the Google Apps Marketplace.

== MashApps development process ==
The MashApps are built from an online mashup enabler called the MashApp Composer. Building a MashApp does not require programming languages like Enterprise Mashup Markup Language. New MashApps are assembled from an existing repository of reusable mashup components like Process Library, external web services

== See also ==
- Google Apps
- Google
