= Nathaniel Edwards =

Nathaniel Edwards may refer to:

- Nathaniel Edwards (politician) (1822–1880), a New Zealand MP
- Sir Nathaniel Edwards, 3rd Baronet (c. 1699–1764), of the Edwards baronets
- Nat Edwards, American baseball player
- Nathaniel Edwards (soccer), Canadian soccer player

== See also ==
- Nate Edwards (1922–2016), American computer scientist
- Weldon Nathaniel Edwards (1788–1873), North Carolina Congressional Representative
- Edwards (surname)
