= Pípa =

The term pípa may refer to any of the following:

- Pipa (琵琶)
- Loquat (枇杷)
- Pipe (disambiguation)
