= Parallel processing =

Parallel processing may refer to:

- Parallel computing
  - Parallel processing (DSP implementation), parallel processing in digital signal processing
- Parallel processing (psychology)
- Parallel process, client/supervisor
