= Xinmiao Zhang =

Chinese-American electrical engineer

- Citizenship: Chinese, American
- Education: Tianjin University (bachelor's degree) 1997 & (master's degree) 2000, University of Minnesota ( Ph.D.) 2005
- Occupations: Electrical Engineer, Professor
- Employer(s): Case Western Reserve University, SanDisk, Western Digital, Ohio State University
- Known for: Contributions to error-correcting codes and VLSI implementations
- Notable work: author, VLSI Architectures for Modern Error-Correcting Codes (CRC Press, 2017)

Xinmiao Zhang is a Chinese and American electrical engineer whose research has included VLSI design, especially as applied in problems of error-correcting codes, cryptography, hardware security, and signal processing. She is a professor of electrical and computer engineering at the Ohio State University.

== Education and career ==
Zhang studied electrical engineering at Tianjin University receiving a bachelor's degree in 1997 and a master's degree in 2000. She continued her graduate studies at the University of Minnesota, where she completed her Ph.D. in 2005. Her dissertation, High-speed VLSI architectures for error-correcting codes and cryptosystems, was supervised by Keshab K. Parhi.

She joined the faculty of Case Western Reserve University in 2005, and became Timothy E. and Allison L. Schroeder Assistant Professor in 2006. She was promoted to associate professor in 2010. From 2013 to 2017 she worked in the electronics industry as a principal research engineer at SanDisk and a senior technologist at Western Digital after it acquired SanDisk in 2017. Returning to academia, she joined Ohio State University as an associate professor in 2017, and is now a full professor there.

== Books ==
Zhang is the author of the book VLSI Architectures for Modern Error-Correcting Codes (CRC Press, 2017). She is the co-editor, with Nicholas Sklavos, of Wireless Security and Cryptography: Specifications and Implementations (CRC Press, 2007).

== Recognition ==
Zhang was named to the 2025 class of IEEE Fellows "for contributions to error-correcting codes and VLSI implementations".
