= Pipes (surname) =

Pipes is an English surname. Notable people with the surname include:

- Alan Pipes (born 1947), English writer and artist
- Ben Pipes (born 1986), British volleyball player
- Cam Pipes (born 1977), Canadian musician
- Daniel Pipes (born 1949), American historian and writer
- David Pipes (disambiguation), multiple people
- Douglas Pipes, American composer
- Felix Pipes (1887–?), Austrian tennis player
- Greg Pipes (1946–2021), American football player
- James Pipes (1840–1928), American awarded soldier
- Leah Pipes (born 1988), American actress
- Martin L. Pipes (1850–1932), American judge
- Richard Pipes (1923–2018), Polish-American historian
- Wade Hampton Pipes (1877–1961), American architect
- William Thomas Pipes (1850–1909), Canadian politician
- Todd David Pipes (born 1967), American musician and songwriter

== See also ==
- Pipes (disambiguation)
- Wesley Lawrence (born 1969), American pornographic actor known as Wesley Pipes
