= Pipeline (disambiguation) =

Pipeline is a system for the long-distance transportation of a liquid or gas.

It may also refer to:

== Electronics, computers and computing ==
- Pipeline (computing), a chain of data-processing stages or a CPU optimization found on
  - Instruction pipelining, a technique for implementing instruction-level parallelism within a single processor
    - Classic RISC pipeline, a five-stage hardware based computer instruction set
  - Pipeline (software), a chain of data-processing processes or other software entities
    - Pipeline (Unix), a set of process chained by their standard streams
    - XML pipeline, a connection of XML transformations
    - CMS Pipelines, an improvement on UNIX piping. Allows multiple streams, moves pointers rather than data, is predictable.
  - Graphics pipeline, the method of rasterization-based rendering as supported by graphics hardware
- Pipelining (DSP implementation), a transformation for optimizing digital circuit
- Telestream pipeline, a video capture and playout hardware device

== Physical infrastructure ==
- Pipeline transport, a conduit made from pipes connected end-to-end for long-distance fluid or gas transport
- A line of Pipe (fluid conveyance)
- Piping in a line
- Plastic pipework, for fluid handling
- Milking pipeline, used on a dairy farm to transport fluid milk

== Business ==
- Sales pipeline, a visualisation of the sales process of a company

== Places ==
- Banzai Pipeline, a surfing spot on the North Shore of Oahu
  - Mister Pipeline, an Oahu surfer title
- Embakasi Pipeline, a neighbourhood in Nairobi
- Tolt Pipeline Trail, an equestrian and biking trail in Redmond, Washington, USA and Canada
- Keystone Pipeline, a partially operational and proposed pipeline from Canada to the Gulf of Mexico
- Trans-Alaska Pipeline System, a pipeline transporting crude oil across Alaska from the Prudhoe Bay oil fields

== In arts and entertainment ==
=== Games ===
- Pipeline (game), a 1988 computer game for the BBC Micro and Acorn Electron
- Pipeline (board game), winner of Games magazine's 1992 Games 100 Game of the Year award

=== Literature ===
- Pipeline (comics), a character from Marvel Comics with the ability to teleport himself and others
- Pipeline (play), a 2017 play written by Dominique Morisseau

=== Music ===
- "Pipeline" (instrumental), a 1963 song by the Chantays
- Pipeline Music, a record label
- "Pipeline", a 1983 song by Depeche Mode from the album Construction Time Again
- "Pipeline", a 1984 song by the Alan Parsons Project from the album Ammonia Avenue
- "Pipeline", a 2012 instrumental by Dannic

=== Other uses in arts and entertainment ===
- Pipeline (film), a 2021 South Korean heist film
- CNN Pipeline, a streaming video service by CNN

== Roller coasters ==
- Pipeline roller coaster, a roller coaster model
- Pipeline: The Surf Coaster, a roller coaster at SeaWorld Orlando in Orlando, Florida

== Other uses ==
- The Pipeline, a former internet service provider
- Alt-right pipeline, a proposed conceptual model for the process of far-right radicalization on social media
- Beep line, an improvised telephone chat line hosted over busy signals
- Drug pipeline, the drugs a pharmaceutical company has in development
- School-to-prison pipeline, a pattern in the U.S., described by scholars and reform activists, of pushing disadvantaged students out of school and into the criminal justice system

== See also ==
- Pipe (disambiguation)
