= J. Paul Morrison =

Computer scientist

J. Paul Morrison (1937-2022) was a British-born Canadian software engineer, software architect, computer scientist, and Wikipedian. He is best known as the creator of flow-based programming and author of "Flow Based Programming: A New Approach to Application Development". In 2013, an interview, which was videotaped, between Paul and Henri Bergius, was held in Toronto.
