= Wayne Stevens (software engineer) =

American computer scientist

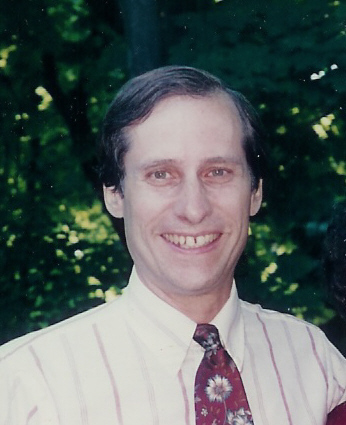
Wayne Stevens

Wayne P. Stevens (1944 - 1993) was an American software engineer, consultant, author, pioneer, and advocate of the practical application of software methods and tools.

== Life & Work ==
Stevens grew up in Missouri, spent two years in India, where he attended the Woodstock School, and earned his M.S. in Electrical Engineering from MIT in 1967. He eventually became the chief architect of application development methodology for IBM's consulting group. The annual Stevens Award Lecture on Software Development Methods is named after him.

He belonged to the IEEE and the ACM as well as the following honorary societies: Tau Beta Pi, Sigma Xi, and Eta Kappa Nu.

He wrote a seminal paper on Structured Design, with Larry Constantine and Glenford Myers, and was the author of a number of books and articles on application design methodologies. He also worked with John Paul Morrison to refine and promote the concepts of what is now called Flow-based programming, including descriptions of FBP in several of these references.

== Publications ==
Stevens published several articles and books, including:

- 1982. How Data Flow can Improve Application Development Productivity, IBM System Journal, Vol. 21, No. 2.
- 1981. Using Structured Design: How to make Programs Simple, Changeable, Flexible and Reusable, John Wiley and Sons.
- 1985. Using Data Flow for Application Development. Byte
- 1990. Software Design - Concepts and Methods, Practical Software Engineering Series, Ed. Allen Macro, Prentice Hall.

Articles, a selection

- Stevens, W. P.; Myers, G. J.; Constantine, L. L. (June 1974). "Structured design". IBM Systems Journal. 13 (2): 115–139. doi:10.1147/sj.132.0115.
- 1988. "Integrating Applications with SAA (Systems Application Architecture)". With L.A. Buchwald & R. W. Davison. In: IBM Systems Journal, Vol 27 No 3, pp 315–324, 1988
- 1991. "Structured Design, Structured Analysis, and Structured Programming". In: American Programmer, Nov. 1991.
- 1994. "Data Flow Analysis and Design". In: Encyclopedia of Software Engineering. John J. Marciniak, Editor-in-Chief, Volume 1, pp 242 – 247, John Wiley & Sons, Inc, 1994.
