= Pipe =

Pipe(s), PIPE(S) or piping may refer to:

== Objects ==
- Pipe (fluid conveyance), a hollow cylinder following certain dimension rules
  - Piping, the use of pipes in industry
- Smoking pipe
  - Tobacco pipe
- Half-pipe and quarter pipe, semi-circular ramps for performing skateboarding/snowboarding tricks
- Piping (sewing), tubular ornamental fabric sewn around the edge of a garment
- For the musical instruments, see below

== Music ==
- Pipe (instrument), a traditional perforated wind instrument
- Bagpipe, a class of musical instrument, aerophones using enclosed reeds
  - Pipes and drums or pipe bands, composed of musicians who play the Scottish and Irish bagpipes
- Organ pipe, one of the tuned resonators that produces the main sound of a pipe organ
- Pan pipes, see Pan flute, an ancient musical instrument based on the principle of the stopped pipe
- Piped music, or elevator music, a type of background music
- "Pipe", by Christie Front Drive from Christie Front Drive, 1994

== Computing ==
- Pipeline (Unix)
- Anonymous pipe and named pipe, a one-way communication channel used for inter-process communication
- "PHY Interface for PCI Express" (PIPE), the name of a specification for the PCI Express physical layer
- Yahoo! Pipes
- sspipes.scr, a screensaver for Microsoft Windows
- PIPE Networks, an Australian company primarily involved in setting up peering exchanges

== Technology ==
- Pipe (casting), a type of metal-casting defect
- Boatswain's pipe, an instrument used for signalling or to issue commands on a warship
- PIPES, a common buffer used in chemistry and biology laboratory work
- Pipe (company), a Belgian automobile manufacturer

== Places ==
- Pipe, Wisconsin, United States
- Pipe, the Hungarian name for Pipea village, Nadeș Commune, Mureș County, Romania

== People ==
- Jules Pipe CBE, Mayor of the London Borough of Hackney, UK
- Justin Pipe, former professional darts player
- Pipes (surname)

== Other uses ==
- Vertical bar, sometimes called "pipe", the character |
- Pipe (letter), the IPA letter for a dental click
- Pipe (unit) or butt, a cask measurement for wine barrels
- Volcanic pipe, a deep, narrow cone of solidified magma
- PIPE deal or private investment in public equity
- Pipes, a slang term for arm muscles
- The Pipes, a 1966 Czech film
- "Pipes", an episode of The Good Doctor
- Monotropa uniflora, a plant also known as ghost pipe or Indian pipe
- Pipes, a name given to the villain of the film Ghostwatch
- Soil piping, subsurface erosion that forms underground cavities.

== See also ==
- Pipeline (disambiguation)
- Piper (disambiguation)
- Pipette, used in chemistry and biology laboratory work
- Piping bags or pastry bags, in cooking, are used to pipe semi-solid foods onto other foods (e.g., icing on a cake)
- Postpipe, archaeological remains of a timber in a posthole
