= David Pipes =

David Pipe or Pipes may refer to:

- David W. Pipes, Jr. (1886–1968), lawyer and sugar planter
- David Pipes (cricketer) (born 1977), English cricketer
- David Pipe (born 1983), Welsh international footballer
- David Pipe (racehorse trainer)
