= Nate Edwards =

American computer scientist

Nathen Porter Edwards (August 24, 1922 – May 26, 2016) was a former IBM hardware architect, retired in 1990. He did his military service in the United States Navy from 1942 to 1946, as a LTJG, Deck, USNR, Pacific, Chief Radio Technician, followed by Stanford University, where he gained an MS EE in 1949.

He worked for IBM from 1949 to 1990, as a Staff Member, Thomas J. Watson Research Center, with the position of Senior Engineer for the last 20 years of this period. He published, sometimes with other authors, 22 technical papers, 14 patents and patent publications — see below.

Between 1949 and 1953, his activities included design and construction of the prototype of the first electronic memory for the IBM 701 computer, and managing digital electronic design for the working prototype of the highly successful AN/FSQ-7 SAGE project. The SAGE system was a nationwide network of computer centers linked to radar inputs and operated by military personnel using graphic and numeric display terminals whose operators directly controlled the air defense fighter activities in real time.

This was followed by a period working for IBM Data Processing Division as Director of Standards for the company-wide transition from vacuum tube technologies to transistor circuits introduced in IBM's 1400 and 7090 computer product line. There he was responsible for planning the new circuit standards and financial controls which moved design of circuits and packaging of IBM products from each individual product group to a company-wide standards activity such that manufacture could be changed from manual assembly to fully automatic assembly and test of digital circuit assemblies. This contributed to the financial success of the IBM 1400 and 7000 series of transistorized computer products.

He then spent two periods of 2 years each in the 1960s and 1980s consulting for the Institute for Defense Analyses (on loan from IBM), Recommendations were made which changed the IS support of the War Room activities in The Pentagon and studies made provided technology projections for future National Military Command System and World-Wide Military Command Systems.

Edwards then became IBM Director of Interdivisional Technical Liaison, in which position he established a number of IBM internal professional groups and conferences.

This was followed by 2 years as Manager, Custom & Defense Systems, IBM World Trade, where he concentrated on directing IBM's efforts relating to the NATO Air Defense information system (NADGE).

During the 1960s and 1970s Edwards' emphasis was on technical planning and assisting in writing Corporate Strategies, while performing studies of image processing, gallium arsenide circuit performance, and representing IBM Research in the GUIDE Applications Development group (AS-201) (GUIDE is no longer in existence, but was a user group similar to SHARE). A major report was prepared as a result of the GUIDE studies relating to the potential for use of specification techniques in preparation of computer applications.

Around 1977, he adopted the term configurable modularity, coined by Raoul de Campo of IBM Research to mean the ability to reuse independent components by changing their interconnections, but not their internals, and developed this concept in several papers. He describes this as a characteristic of all systems that can be said to be "engineered", and this is one of the key concepts in the technology now referred to as Flow-Based Programming.

After retirement, Edwards established, with E. C. Lamb, ELI Research and Engineering, Inc. Campbell Stubbs has a 10% interest in ELI R&E, and a patent owned by it (see below). They have concentrated on the design and patenting of an assembly-line-based data processing architecture which has potential performance in the high Teraflop range, using off-the-shelf hardware, while being simple to program and extremely resistant to hackers and other mischief. Systems can be built which produce results which can be certified to conform to specification, as is standard practice in physical manufacturing systems. This work has resulted in granting of U.S. Patent #5,742,823 (see below), issued in the U.S. and Mexico in 1998, and Canada in 1999. Patents are currently being issued in Belgium, Switzerland, Ireland, France and Germany.

== Publications ==
- Edwards, Nathen P.; Tellier, H. (November 1974). "A Look at Characterizing the Design of Information Systems". Proceedings of the ACM National Conference: 612–621.
- Edwards, Nathen P. (April 1975). "The effect of certain modular design principles on testability". Proceedings of the international conference on Reliable software -. pp. 401–410. doi:10.1145/800027.808463. S2CID 17932700.
- N.P. Edwards; et al. (November 1975). "Automated Ellipsometer". IBM Technical Disclosure Bulletin. 18 (6): 2031.
- Edwards, Nathen P. (August 18, 1977). "On the Architectural Requirements of an Engineered System". IBM Research Report, RC 6688 (#28797), T.J. Watson Research Center, Yorktown Heights, NY.
- Edwards, Nathen P.; Lamb, E. Charles (April 12, 1989). "Engineered Software". IBM Research Report, T.J. Watson Research Center, Yorktown Heights, NY: 1–23.
- U.S. Patent #3,626,384 (1971-12-07) J. B. Davis, N. P. Edwards, H.H. Herd, "Method for Representing Measured Data Values by Coefficient Values".
- U.S. Patent #4,239,983 (1980-12-16) N.P. Edwards et al., "Non-destructive charge transfer device differencing circuit".
- U.S. Patent #4,885,627 (1989-12-05) N.P. Edwards, "Method and structure for reducing resistance in integrated circuits".
- U.S. Patent #5,742,823 (1998-04-21) N.P. Edwards et al., "Total object processing system and method with assembly line features and certification of results".
