= Telestream pipeline =

Pipeline from Telestream is a network video capture and playout hardware device which is used to move SDI (Serial digital interface) and tape-based video and audio in and out of file-based workflows. It is also known as an encoder and capturing system for QuickTime and Final Cut Pro.

Pipeline has been used as the main video capture device by "renowned producer and editor, Mitch Jacobson" for "two recent major live events: an Elton John concert and a Guitar Hero publicity launch for Aerosmith.

== Specifications ==
- Network-accessible SDI video capture and playout devices
- Encode to multiple HD and/or SD formats in a single box
- Edit or transcode media files while they are being captured
- Schedule automated live ingest or log from tape
- Sits on your network – so anyone can access it
- Real-time, reliable hardware encoding
