= IBM Mashup Center =

End-to-end enterprise mashup platform

The IBM Mashup Center is an end-to-end enterprise mashup platform that enables the rapid creation, sharing, and discovery of reusable application building blocks (widgets, feeds, mashups) that can be easily assembled into new applications or leveraged within existing applications.

== Features ==
The IBM Mashup Center is designed to help users at all skill levels create simple web applications from existing information sources by dragging and dropping widgets onto the page, and then wiring them together on-the-glass. The tool includes a Mashup Builder to assemble mashups, and a set of out-of-the-box, business-ready widgets that jump-start mashup creation and enhanced information visualization options, such as charting. Users can extend their mashup environment by incorporating custom developed widgets provided by IT, widgets available on the external IBM Mashup Catalog, or widgets from across the Web, including any of the thousands of Google Gadgets.

Once a mashup is assembled, it can be shared. Visual tools are provided that allow end users to define what users or groups can view or edit their various pages. Mashups can also be published to the catalog, where other users can easily reuse them. The IBM Mashup Center V2.0. contains a set of new capabilities for the delivery of mashup applications and widgets, including a new browser-based tool for simple widget creation, new and enhanced visualization widgets, and a new feature called "spaces" that allows users to collaboratively build and share multi-page enterprise mashups.
