= David Pipes (cricketer) =

English cricketer (born 1977)

Personal information
- Full name: David John Pipes
- Born: 26 April 1977 (age 49); Lincoln, Lincolnshire, England
- Batting: Right-handed
- Bowling: Right-arm medium

Domestic team information
- Years: Team
- 2000–2003: Lincolnshire
- 1994: Nottinghamshire

Career statistics
Competition	First-class	List A
Matches	1	5
Runs scored	12	14
Batting average	12.00	20.50
100s/50s	–/–	–/1
Top score	11*	6*
Balls bowled	48	202
Wickets	–	3
Bowling average	–	57.66
5 wickets in innings	–	–
10 wickets in match	–	–
Best bowling	–	3/24
Catches/stumpings	–/–	1/–
- Source: Cricinfo, 23 June 2011

David John Pipes (born 26 April 1977) is an English cricketer. Pipes is a right-handed batsman who bowled right-arm medium pace. He was born in Lincoln, Lincolnshire.

Pipes made a single first-class appearance for Nottinghamshire at the age of 17 against Oxford University. In this match he was dismissed for a single run in Nottinghamshire's first-innings by Chris Hollins, while in their second-innings he scored 11 unbeaten runs. He also bowled 8 wicket-less overs. He never appeared for Nottinghamshire again.

Pipes later made his debut for Lincolnshire in the 2000 Minor Counties Championship against Northumberland. Pipes played Minor counties cricket for Lincolnshire from 2000 to 2003, which included 23 Minor Counties Championship matches and 10 MCCA Knockout Trophy matches. He made his List A debut against Lancashire in the 2000 NatWest Trophy. He played 4 further List A matches for Lincolnshire, the last coming against Cheshire in the 2nd round of the 2003 Cheltenham & Gloucester Trophy which was played in 2002. In his 5 matches, he took 3 wickets at an average of 57.66, with best figures of 3/24.
