= Google Mashup Editor =

Online mashup creation service

- Developer: Google
- Operating system: Any (Web-based application)
- Available in: English
- Type: Mashup editor
- Website: editor.googlemashups.com

Google Mashup Editor was an online mashup creation service created by Google that has been discontinued. It used CodePress as its syntax highlighting code editor, which also has been discontinued.

== History ==
On January 15, 2009, Vic Gundotra, Google's VP of Engineering, announced that the Mashup Editor would be migrated to the Google App Engine:

"Existing Mashup Editor applications will stop receiving traffic in six months, and we hope you will join our team in making the exciting transition to App Engine."
