= Open Mashup Alliance =

- Abbreviation: OMA
- Formation: September 2009; 16 years ago
- Type: Standards Development Organization
- Region served: Worldwide
- Members: Mashup Product Vendors, Mashup technology users

The Open Mashup Alliance (OMA) is a non-profit consortium that promotes the adoption of mashup solutions in the enterprise through the evolution of enterprise mashup standards like EMML. The initial members of the OMA include some large technology companies such as Adobe Systems, Hewlett-Packard, and Intel and some major technology users such as Bank of America and Capgemini.

According to Dion Hinchcliffe, "Ultimately, the OMA creates a standardized approach to enterprise mashups that creates an open and vibrant market for competing runtimes, mashups, and an array of important aftermarket services such as development/testing tools, management and administration appliances, governance frameworks, education, professional services, and so on."

== Specification development ==
The initial focus of the OMA is developing EMML, which is a declarative mashup domain-specific language (DSL) aimed at creating enterprise mashups.

The EMML language provides a comprehensive set of high-level mashup-domain vocabulary to consume and mash a variety of web data sources. EMML provides a uniform syntax to invoke heterogeneous service styles: REST, WSDL, RSS/ATOM, RDBMS, and POJO. EMML also provides the ability to mix and match diverse data formats: XML, JSON, JDBC, JavaObjects, and primitive types.

The OMA website provides the EMML specification, the EMML schema, a reference runtime implementation capable of running EMML scripts, sample EMML mashup scripts, and technical documentation.

The OMA is developing EMML under a Creative Commons Attribution No Derivatives license.

The eventual objective of the OMA is to submit the EMML specification and any other OMA specifications to a recognized industry standards body.

== See also ==
- Service-oriented architecture (SOA)
- Web 2.0
