= Mashup (web application hybrid) =

Graphical interface from multiple sources

A mashup (computer industry jargon), in web development, is a web page or web application that uses content from more than one source to create a single new service displayed in a single graphical interface. For example, a user could combine the addresses and photographs of their library branches with a Google map to create a map mashup. The term implies easy, fast integration, frequently using open application programming interfaces (open API) and data sources to produce enriched results that were not necessarily the original reason for producing the raw source data. The term mashup originally comes from creating something by combining elements from two or more sources.

The main characteristics of a mashup are combination, visualization, and aggregation. It is important to make existing data more useful, for personal and professional use. To be able to permanently access the data of other services, mashups are generally client applications or hosted online.

In the past years, more and more Web applications have published APIs that enable software developers to easily integrate data and functions the SOA way, instead of building them by themselves. Mashups can be considered to have an active role in the evolution of social software and Web 2.0. Mashup composition tools are usually simple enough to be used by end-users. They generally do not require programming skills and rather support visual wiring of GUI widgets, services and components together. Therefore, these tools contribute to a new vision of the Web, where users are able to contribute.

The term "mashup" is not formally defined by any standard-setting body.

== History ==
The broader context of the history of the Web provides a background for the development of mashups. Under the Web 1.0 model, organizations stored consumer data on portals and updated them regularly. They controlled all the consumer data, and the consumer had to use their products and services to get the information.

The advent of Web 2.0 introduced Web standards that were commonly and widely adopted across traditional competitors and which unlocked the consumer data. At the same time, mashups emerged, allowing mixing and matching competitors' APIs to develop new services.

The first mashups used mapping services or photo services to combine these services with data of any kind and therefore to produce visualizations of data. In the beginning, most mashups were consumer-based, but recently the mashup is to be seen as an interesting concept useful also to enterprises. Business mashups can combine existing internal data with external services to generate new views on the data. There was also the free Yahoo! Pipes to build mashups for free using the Yahoo! Query Language.

== Types of mashup ==
There are many types of mashup, such as business mashups, consumer mashups, and data mashups. The most common type of mashup is the consumer mashup, aimed at the general public.

- Business (or enterprise) mashups define applications that combine their own resources, application and data, with other external Web services. They focus data into a single presentation and allow for collaborative action among businesses and developers. This works well for an agile development project, which requires collaboration between the developers and customer (or customer proxy, typically a product manager) for defining and implementing the business requirements. Enterprise mashups are secure, visually rich Web applications that expose actionable information from diverse internal and external information sources.
- Consumer mashups combine data from multiple public sources in the browser and organize it through a simple browser user interface. (e.g.: Wikipediavision combines Google Map and a Wikipedia API)
- Data mashups, opposite to the consumer mashups, combine similar types of media and information from multiple sources into a single representation. The combination of all these resources create a new and distinct Web service that was not originally provided by either source.

=== By API type ===
Mashups can also be categorized by the basic API type they use but any of these can be combined with each other or embedded into other applications.

==== Data types ====
- Indexed data (documents, weblogs, images, videos, shopping articles, jobs ...) used by metasearch engines
- Cartographic and geographic data: geolocation software, geovisualization
- Feeds, podcasts: news aggregators

==== Functions ====
- Data converters: language translators, speech processing, URL shorteners...
- Communication: email, instant messaging, notification...
- Visual data rendering: information visualization, diagrams
- Security related: electronic payment systems, ID identification...
- Editors

== Mashup enabler ==
In technology, a mashup enabler is a tool for transforming incompatible IT resources into a form that allows them to be easily combined, in order to create a mashup. Mashup enablers allow powerful techniques and tools (such as mashup platforms) for combining data and services to be applied to new kinds of resources. An example of a mashup enabler is a tool for creating an RSS feed from a spreadsheet (which cannot easily be used to create a mashup). Many mashup editors include mashup enablers, for example, Presto Mashup Connectors, Convertigo Web Integrator or Caspio Bridge.

Mashup enablers have also been described as "the service and tool providers, [sic] that make mashups possible".

=== History ===
Early mashups were developed manually by enthusiastic programmers. However, as mashups became more popular, companies began creating platforms for building mashups, which allow designers to visually construct mashups by connecting together mashup components.

Mashup editors have greatly simplified the creation of mashups, significantly increasing the productivity of mashup developers and even opening mashup development to end-users and non-IT experts. Standard components and connectors enable designers to combine mashup resources in all sorts of complex ways with ease. Mashup platforms, however, have done little to broaden the scope of resources accessible by mashups and have not freed mashups from their reliance on well-structured data and open libraries (RSS feeds and public APIs).

Mashup enablers evolved to address this problem, providing the ability to convert other kinds of data and services into mashable resources.

=== Web resources ===
Of course, not all valuable data is located within organizations. In fact, the most valuable information for business intelligence and decision support is often external to the organization. With the emergence of rich web applications and online Web portals, a wide range of business-critical processes (such as ordering) are becoming available online. Unfortunately, very few of these data sources syndicate content in RSS format and very few of these services provide publicly accessible APIs. Mashup editors therefore solve this problem by providing enablers or connectors.

== Mashups versus portals ==
Mashups and portals are both content aggregation technologies. Portals are an older technology designed as an extension to traditional dynamic Web applications, in which the process of converting data content into marked-up Web pages is split into two phases: generation of markup "fragments" and aggregation of the fragments into pages. Each markup fragment is generated by a "portlet", and the portal combines them into a single Web page. Portlets may be hosted locally on the portal server or remotely on a separate server.

Portal technology defines a complete event model covering reads and updates. A request for an aggregate page on a portal is translated into individual read operations on all the portlets that form the page ("render" operations on local, JSR 168 portlets or "getMarkup" operations on remote, WSRP portlets). If a submit button is pressed on any portlet on a portal page, it is translated into an update operation on that portlet alone (processAction on a local portlet or performBlockingInteraction on a remote, WSRP portlet). The update is then immediately followed by a read on all portlets on the page.

Portal technology is about server-side, presentation-tier aggregation. It cannot be used to drive more robust forms of application integration such as two-phase commit.

Mashups differ from portals in the following respects:

	Portal	Mashup
Classification	Older technology, extension of traditional Web server model using well-defined approach	Uses newer, loosely defined "Web 2.0" techniques
Philosophy/approach	Approaches aggregation by splitting role of Web server into two phases: markup generation and aggregation of markup fragments	Uses APIs provided by different content sites to aggregate and reuse the content in another way
Content dependencies	Aggregates presentation-oriented markup fragments (HTML, WML, VoiceXML, etc.)	Can operate on pure XML content and also on presentation-oriented content (e.g., HTML)
Location dependencies	Traditionally, content aggregation takes place on the server	Content aggregation can take place either on the server or on the client
Aggregation style	"Salad bar" style: Aggregated content is presented 'side-by-side' without overlaps	"Melting pot" style - Individual content may be combined in any manner, resulting in arbitrarily structured hybrid content
Event model	Read and update event models are defined through a specific portlet API	CRUD operations are based on REST architectural principles, but no formal API exists
Relevant standards	Portlet behavior is governed by standards JSR 168, JSR 286 and WSRP, although portal page layout and portal functionality are undefined and vendor-specific	Base standards are XML interchanged as REST or Web Services. RSS and Atom are commonly used. More specific mashup standards such as EMML are emerging.

The portal model has been around longer and has had greater investment and product research. Portal technology is therefore more standardized and mature. Over time, increasing maturity and standardization of mashup technology will likely make it more popular than portal technology because it is more closely associated with Web 2.0 and lately Service-oriented Architectures (SOA). New versions of portal products are expected to eventually add mashup support while still supporting legacy portlet applications. Mashup technologies, in contrast, are not expected to provide support for portal standards.

== Business mashups ==
Mashup uses are expanding in the business environment. Business mashups are useful for integrating business and data services, as business mashups technologies provide the ability to develop new integrated services quickly, to combine internal services with external or personalized information, and to make these services tangible to the business user through user-friendly Web browser interfaces.

Business mashups differ from consumer mashups in the level of integration with business computing environments, security and access control features, governance, and the sophistication of the programming tools (mashup editors) used. Another difference between business mashups and consumer mashups is a growing trend of using business mashups in commercial software as a service (SaaS) offering.

Many of the providers of business mashups technologies have added SOA features.

== Architectural aspects of mashups ==
The architecture of a mashup is divided into three layers:

- Presentation / user interaction: this is the user interface of mashups. The technologies used are HTML/XHTML, CSS, JavaScript, Asynchronous JavaScript and Xml (Ajax).
- Web Services: the product's functionality can be accessed using API services. The technologies used are XMLHTTPRequest, XML-RPC, JSON-RPC, SOAP, REST.
- Data: handling the data like sending, storing and receiving. The technologies used are XML, JSON, KML.

Architecturally, there are two styles of mashups: Web-based and server-based. Whereas Web-based mashups typically use the user's web browser to combine and reformat the data, server-based mashups analyze and reformat the data on a remote server and transmit the data to the user's browser in its final form.

Mashups appear to be a variation of a façade pattern. That is: a software engineering design pattern that provides a simplified interface to a larger body of code (in this case the code to aggregate the different feeds with different APIs).

Mashups can be used with software provided as a service (SaaS).

After several years of standards development, mainstream businesses are starting to adopt service-oriented architectures (SOA) to integrate disparate data by making them available as discrete Web services. Web services provide open, standardized protocols to provide a unified means of accessing information from a diverse set of platforms (operating systems, programming languages, applications). These Web services can be reused to provide completely new services and applications within and across organizations, providing business flexibility.

== See also ==
- Mashup (culture)
- Mashup (music)
- Open Mashup Alliance
- Open API
- Yahoo! Pipes
- Webhook
- Web portal
- Web scraping
