= Michigan (disambiguation) =

Michigan is a U.S. state.

Michigan may also refer to:

== Places ==
- Michigan, West Virginia
- Michigan City, Indiana
- Michigan City, North Dakota
- Lake Michigan, one of the Great Lakes, an inland fresh-water sea
- Lake Michigan Shore AVA, Michigan wine region
- University of Michigan typically the flagship Ann Arbor campus
  - Michigan Wolverines, the athletic program of the University of Michigan

== Transport ==
- USS Michigan, U.S. Navy ship
- SS Michigan (1941), a cargo liner in service 1960-69
- Dodge Michigan, the nameplate used for the Plymouth Reliant for the Japanese market
- Michigan (1903 automobile), built by the Michigan Automobile Company 1903–1908
- Michigan (1908 automobile), built by the Michigan Buggy Company 1908–1914
- Michigan station (Detroit), a Detroit People Mover station

== Entertainment ==
- Michigan (album), also known as Greetings from Michigan: The Great Lake State, an album by Sufjan Stevens
- Michigan: Report from Hell, a horror-themed video game released for the PlayStation 2
- Michigan J. Frog, a Looney Tunes cartoon character
- "Michigan", song by The Milk Carton Kids from album Prologue
- "Michigan", a song by John Linnell from the album State Songs, 1999

== Other uses ==
- Michigan goal, a scoring tactic in ice hockey
- Michigan hot dog, a Canadian hot dog slathered with meat sauce, similar to the Coney Island hot dog
- Michigan (grape), another name for the Catawba grape

== See also ==
- Michigan Avenue (disambiguation)
- Michigan City (disambiguation)
- Michigan Township (disambiguation)
