= Opera window =

Type of small fixed window of an automobile

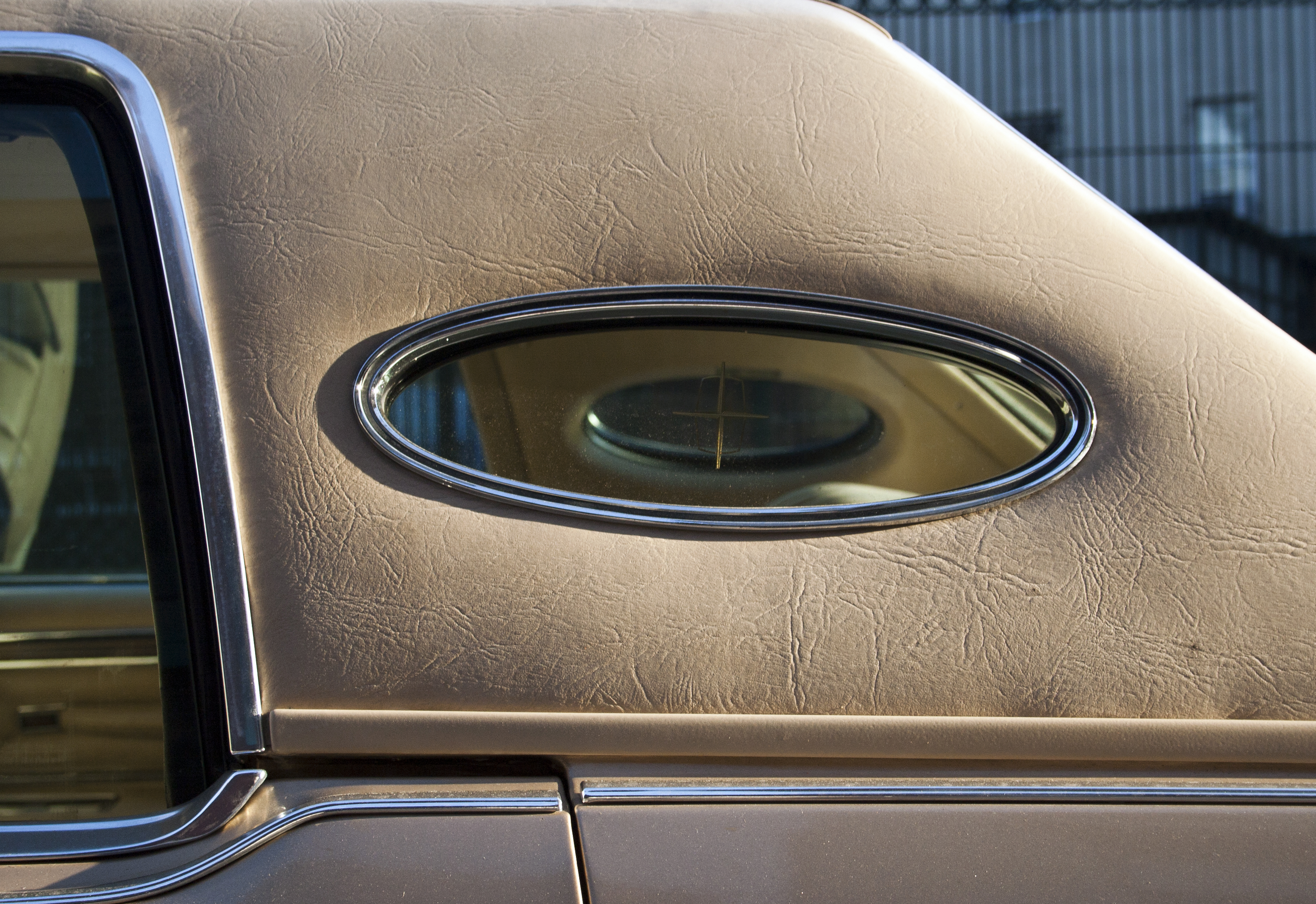
Opera window, with photo-etched logo, and padded Landau roof on a 1979 Lincoln Continental Town Car

An opera window is a small fixed window usually behind the rear side window of an automobile, originating with small windows mounted in the fabric of a folding top on horse-drawn carriages. They are typically mounted in an automobile's C-pillar, usually within a padded, vinylled section of the roof as a reference to the original location in a fabric roof. The design feature was popular, mainly with domestic U.S. manufacturers but also seen in Japan, during the 1970s and early 1980s..

The origin was from "opera" vehicles of around 1915 with occasional collapsible seating for extra passengers. The opera window was also a feature on "formal roof" and limousine models with higher than a normal roof to accommodate passengers with top hats.

== History ==
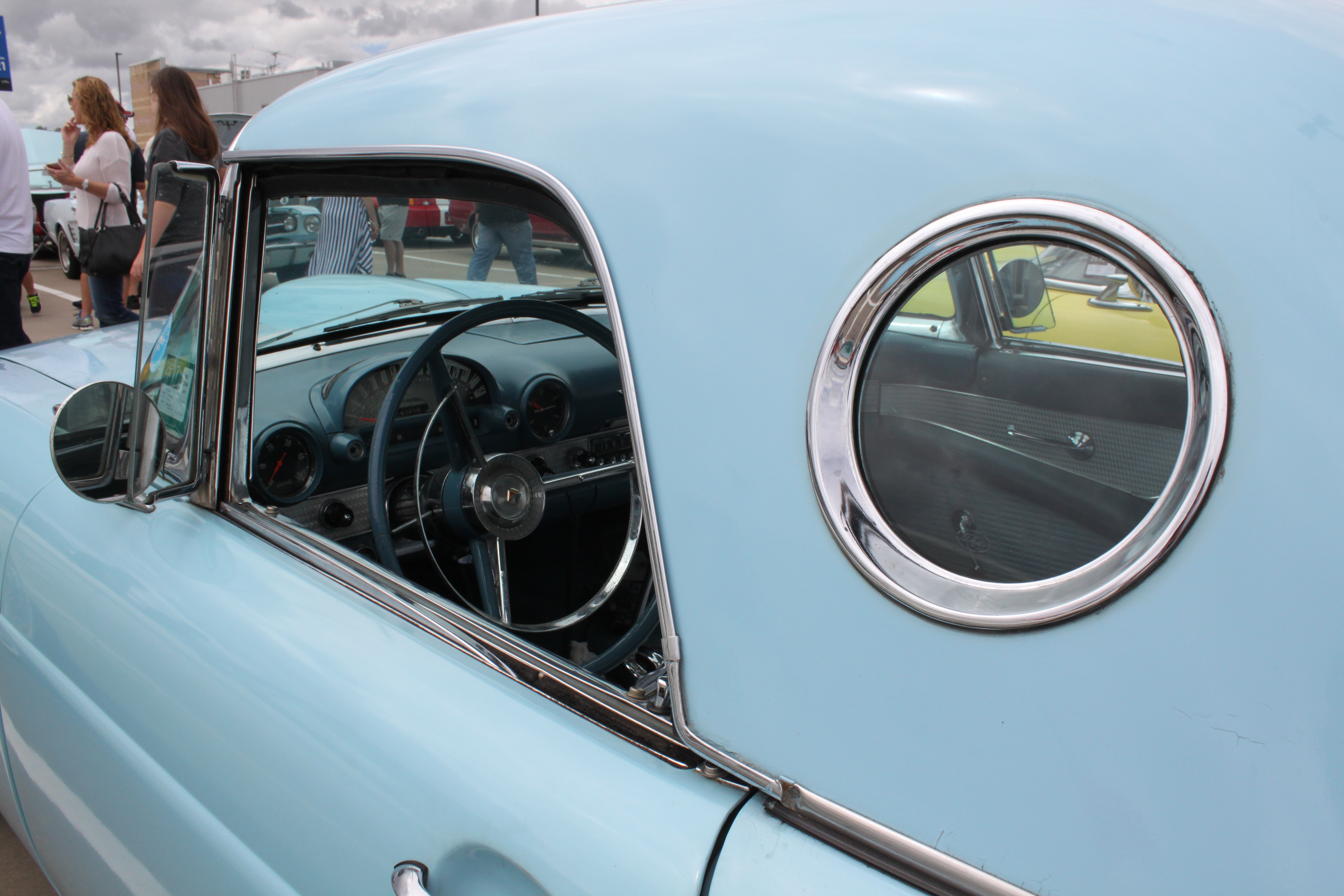
1956–1957 Ford Thunderbird "porthole" opera window in removable hardtop

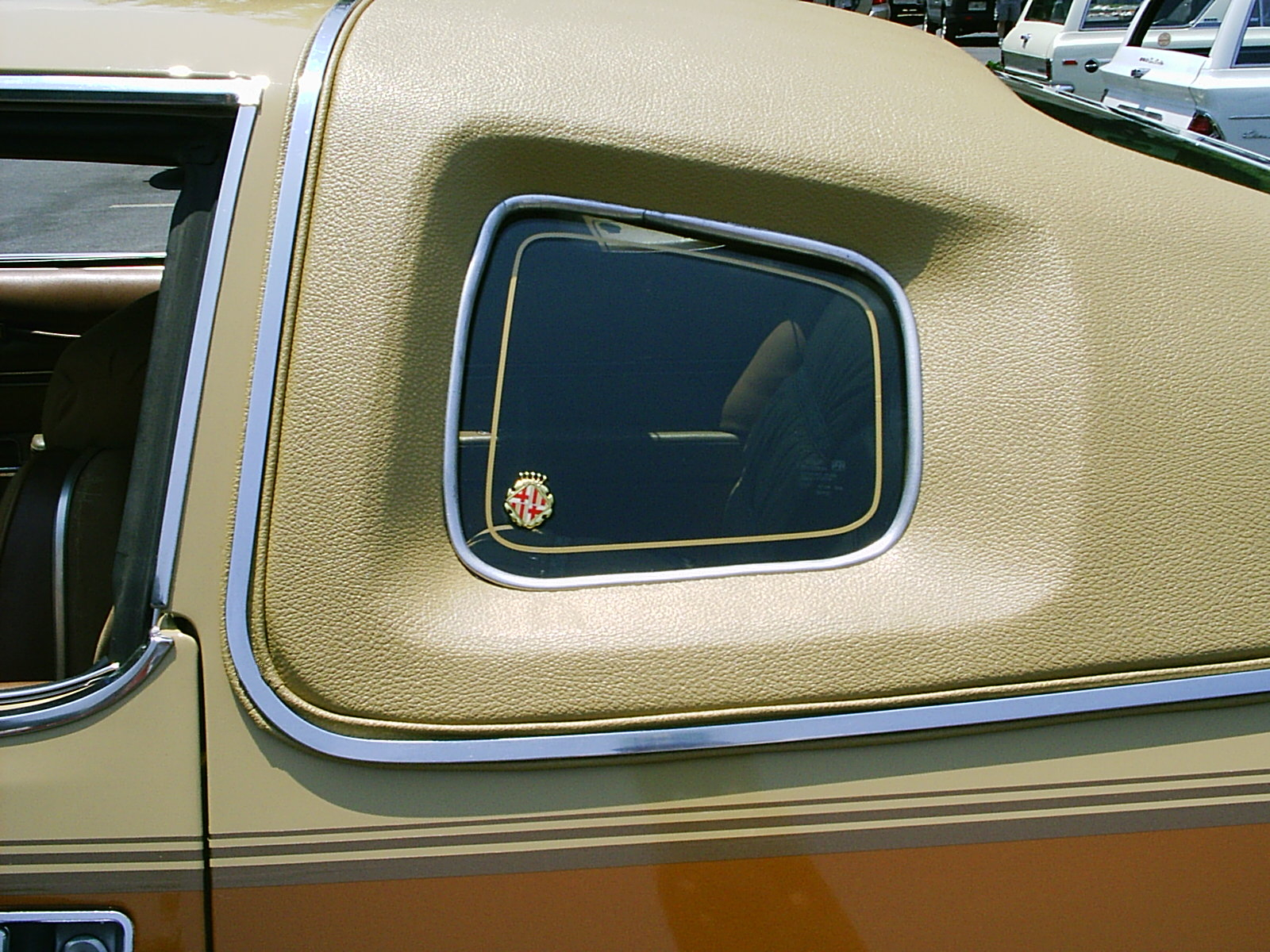
1977 AMC Matador Barcelona coupe fixed opera window surrounded by padded Landau roof

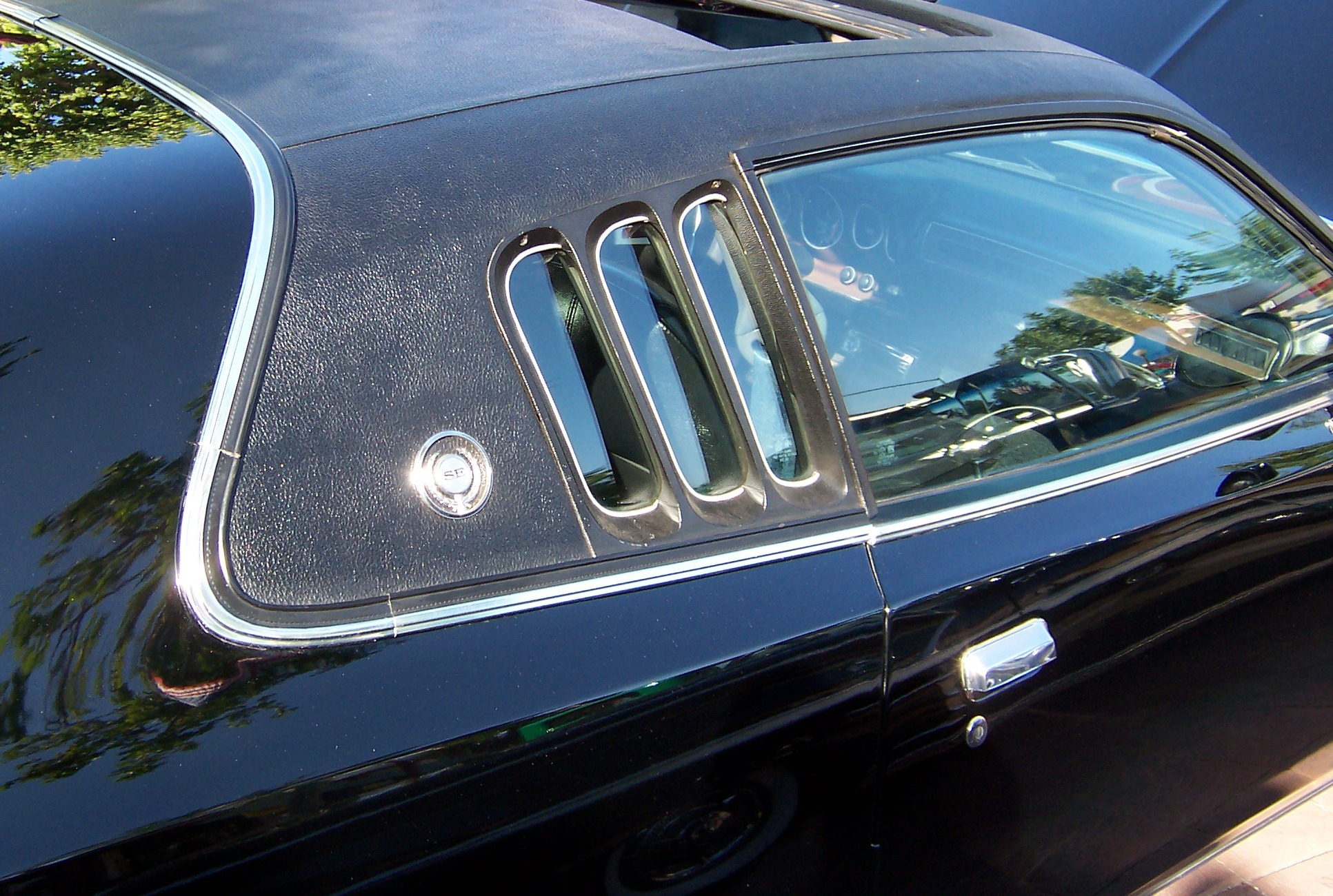
1973 Dodge Charger SE coupe fixed opera window behind the side door glass

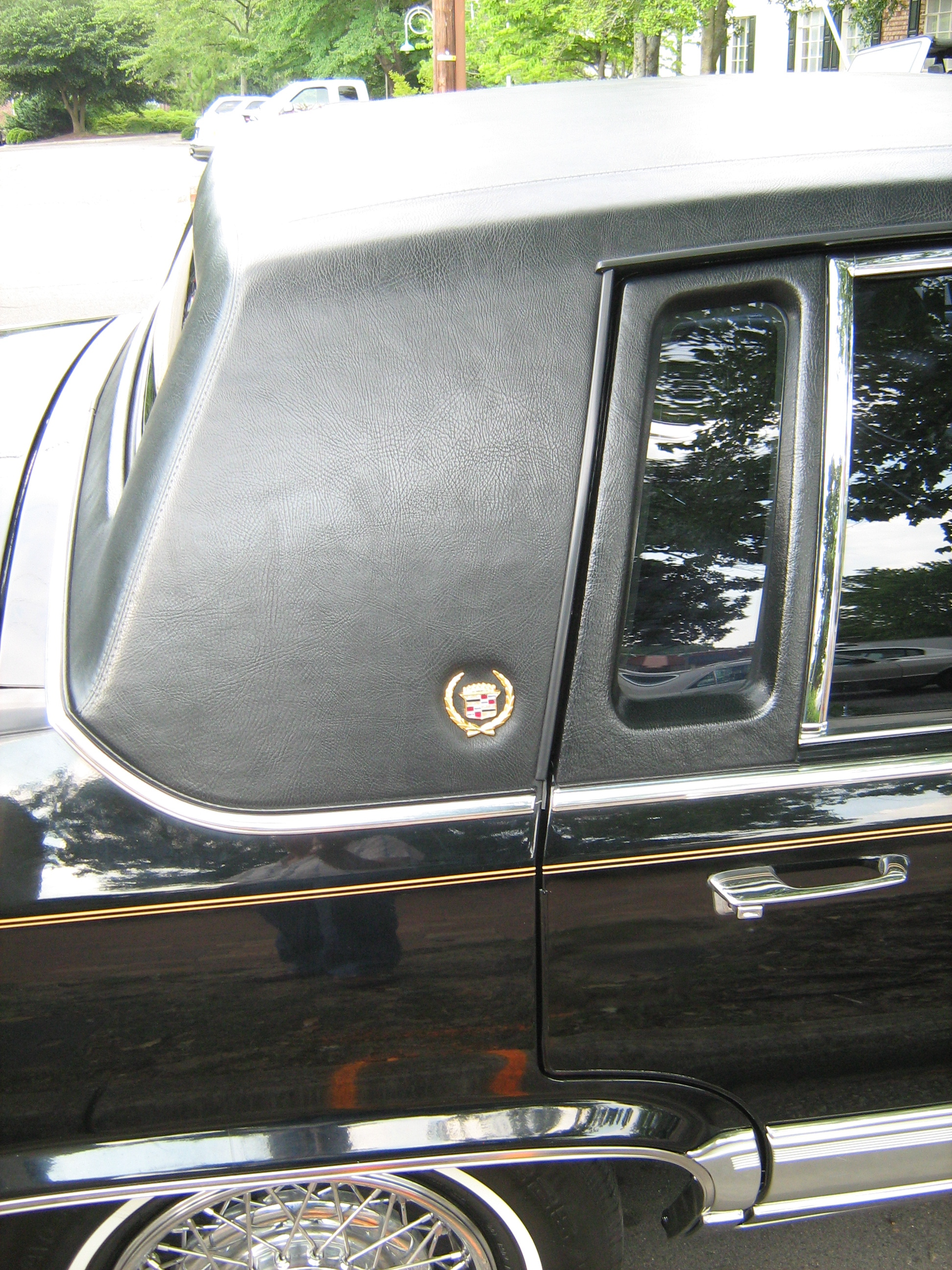
1991 Cadillac Brougham opera window as part of the rear door

The design element of a distinct, fixed, centered opera window was borrowed from such windows in horse-drawn carriages and used during the classical era of automobile styling. For example, "the Elcar in 1924 was good looking ... and even a fabric top in the style of a brougham with oval opera windows framed by landau bars". Opera windows saw their demise in the 1930s.

Perhaps the most notable return was the "porthole" in the 1956–1957 Ford Thunderbird. It was provided as an option to improve rear-quarter visibility with the removable hardtop in place. "The hottest thing going was the 'porthole' window in the rear side pillar – called 'opera windows' – that came in during the horse and buggy [era]".

Opera windows began reappearing in the early 1970s in such vehicles as the 1972 Continental Mark IV. Almost all personal luxury cars would adopt opera windows, usually framed by a vinyl roof. Most often, opera window variants were applied on two-door hardtop or coupé models, spanning all types of vehicles from economy compacts to flagship personal luxury cars, in which latter exploding realm they became "recognition elements" seeking to add a vintage element to their styling. General Motors introduced an all-new line of mid-sized "Colonade" models for the 1973 model year. Standard on all the coupes was a fixed triangular rear quarter window while higher trim versions used a rectangular vertical opera window.

In some cars, an additional feature was the so-called opera light that was mounted on the outside of the B-pillar or C-pillar and illuminated when the exterior lights were switched on.

== Function ==
The windows also helped offset the significant blind spots created by wide C-pillars that were characteristic of many American cars produced at this time. In an age of decreasing dimensions and increasingly common use of non-opening rear side windows on two-door models, a variety of shapes of rear windows may have helped passengers there to feel somewhat less claustrophobic.

These windows were usually non-functional; however, in the case of the AMC Matador coupe NASCAR racers, the standard roll-down quarter windows were causing aerodynamic drag. Penske racing requested AMC a small "porthole" to smooth the airflow when open to the wind under racing conditions. To qualify as a stock item for use on the tracks, NASCAR required 500 units must be available to the public. The small opera window was first an optional "D/L Formal Window Package" on the Brougham models and then a standard feature on the Barcelona II trim package.

== Examples ==
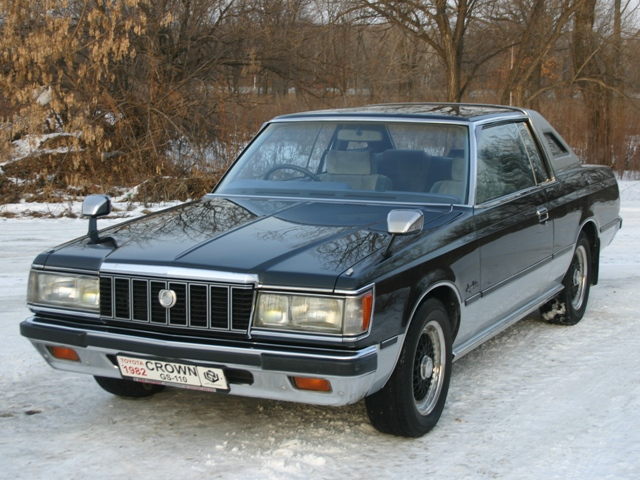
Toyota Crown coupe

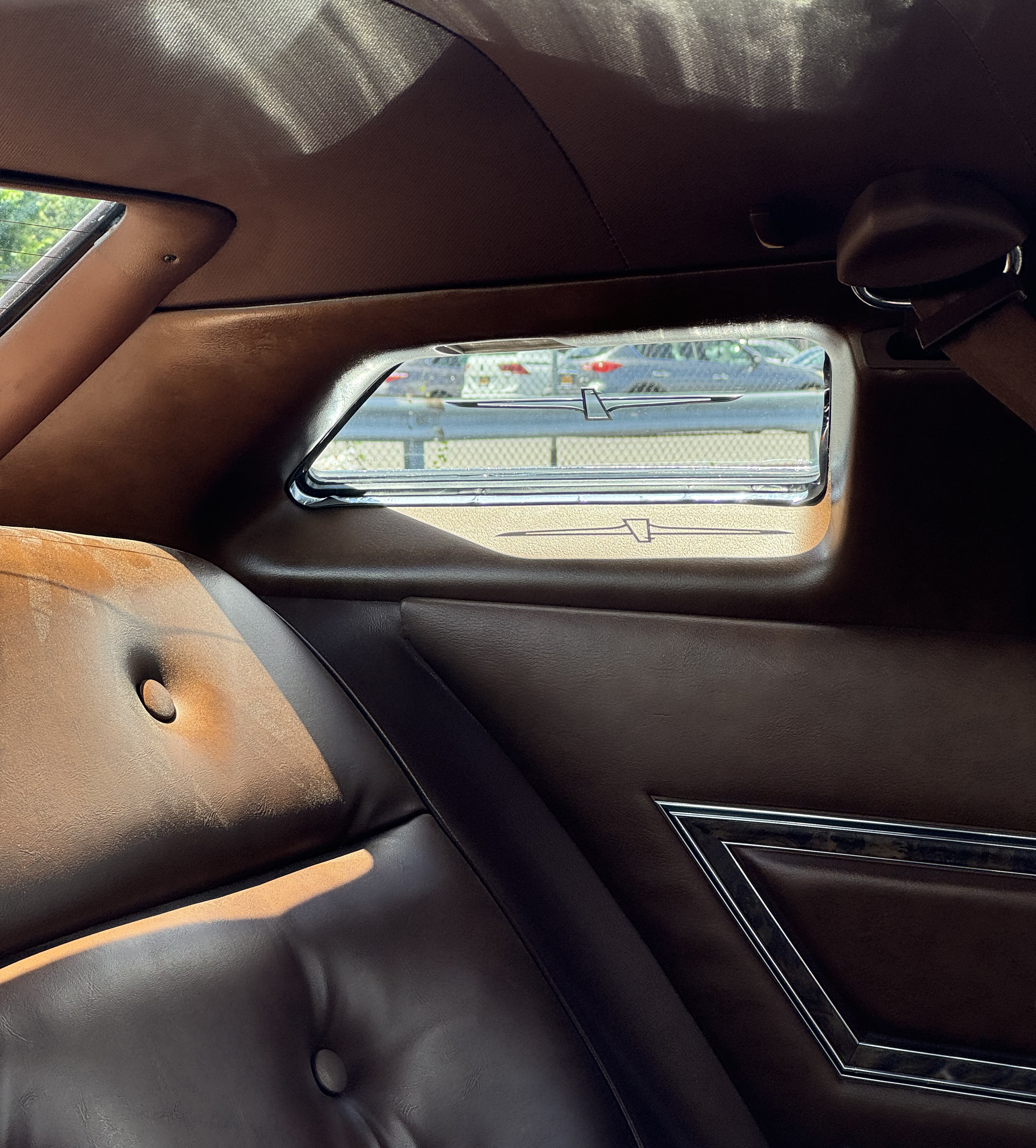
Interior view (1976 Ford Thunderbird)

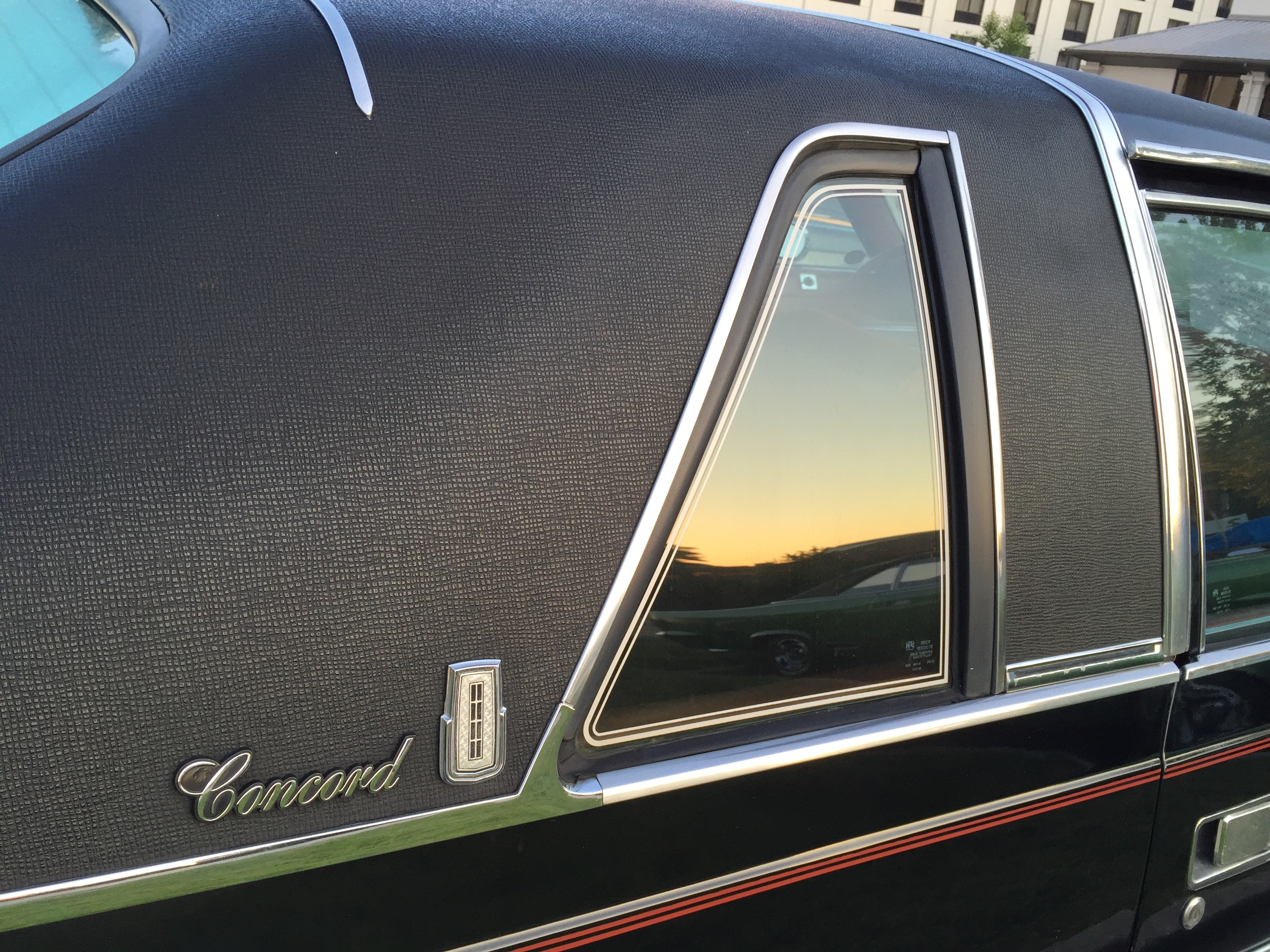
1979 AMC Concord with standard "landau" roof trim

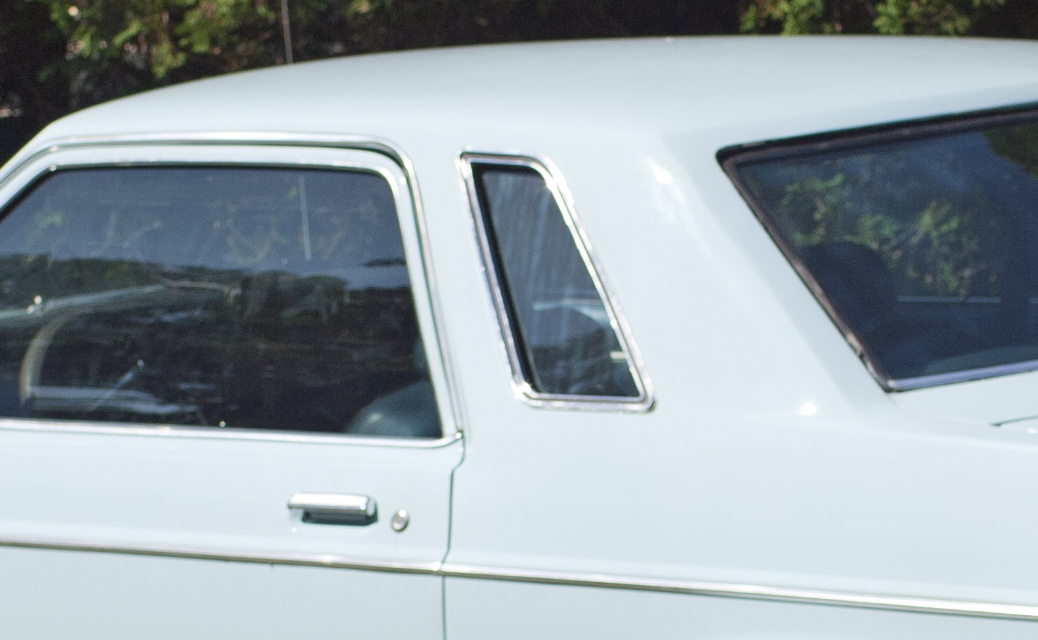
1977 Mercury Monarch with standard painted roof
- AMC Concord (1978–1982 coupe, 1980–1983 4-door sedan)
- AMC Eagle coupe (1980–1988), 4-door (1980–1988)
- AMC Matador coupe: D/L Formal Window Package (1974–1975) and Barcelona (1976–1978)
- Buick Regal coupe (1973–1977)
- Buick Riviera (1974–1978)
- Cadillac Coupe de Ville (1974–1979, 1985–1993)
- Cadillac Sedan de Ville (1975–1976)
- Cadillac Eldorado (1971–1978)
- Cadillac Fleetwood Brougham coupe (1980–1985)
- Cadillac Fleetwood coupe (1985–1986, 1989–1992)
- Cadillac Sixty Special coupe (1993)
- Cadillac Fleetwood 75 series (1971–1976, 1985–1987)
- Cadillac Fleetwood limousine (1977–1984)
- Chevrolet Caprice (1974–1980)
- Chevrolet Chevelle coupe (including Malibu and Laguna, 1973–1977)
- Chevrolet Concours coupe (1976–1977)
- Chevrolet Impala (1974–1976)
- Chevrolet Monte Carlo (1973–1977, 1981–1988)
- Chrysler Cordoba (1975–1983)
- Chrysler LeBaron coupe (1977–1986)
- Chrysler Newport (1976–1978)
- Chrysler New Yorker (1974–1978)
- Chrysler TC by Maserati (1989–1991) on the removable hardtop
- Continental Mark IV, V & VI (1972–1983)
- Daihatsu Charade Runabout (G10/20, 1978–1983)
- Dodge 400 (1981–1983)
- Dodge 600 coupe (1984–1986)
- Dodge Aries 2-door (1981–1989)
- Dodge Aspen coupe (1976–1980)
- Dodge Charger (1973–1978)
- Dodge Diplomat coupe (1977–1981)
- Dodge Magnum (1978–1979)
- Dodge Mirada (1980–1983)
- Dodge Monaco coupe (1977–1978)
- Dodge Royal Monaco coupe (1974–1977)
- Ford Elite (1974–1976)
- Ford Granada 2-door (1975–1980)
- Ford Mustang II Ghia (1975–1978)
- Ford LTD, Crown Victoria 2-door (1975–1987)
- Ford LTD II (1977–1979)
- Ford Thunderbird (1956–1957, 1973–1982, 2002–2005)
- Ford Torino 2-door (1974–1976)
- Imperial LeBaron coupe (1974–1975)
- Lincoln Continental (1975–1980)
- Lincoln Town Car (1981–1997)
- Mazda Cosmo/121L/RX-5 (1975–1980)
- Mercury Cougar (1974–1982)
- Mercury Marquis, Grand Marquis 2-door (1979–1987)
- Mercury Monarch 2-door (1975–1980)
- Mercury Montego 2-door (1974–1976)
- Nissan Silvia S110 series 2-door coupe (1979–1983)
- Oldsmobile 88 (1974–1984)
- Oldsmobile 98 (1974–1987)
- Oldsmobile Cutlass coupe (1973–1977)
- Oldsmobile Cutlass Calais coupe (1981–1984)
- Oldsmobile Cutlass Salon coupe (1985–1988)
- Oldsmobile Cutlass Supreme (1973–1988)
- Oldsmobile Omega coupe (1975–1979)
- Oldsmobile Toronado (1974–1978)
- Pontiac Bonneville (1975–1979)
- Pontiac Catalina (1974–1976)
- Pontiac Grand Am coupe (1973–1977)
- Pontiac Grand Prix (1973–1987)
- Pontiac Grand Ville (1974–1975)
- Pontiac Lemans coupe (1973–1980)
- Pontiac Phoenix coupe (1977–1979)
- Pontiac Sunbird notchback coupe (1976–1980)
- Pontiac Ventura coupe (1975–1979)
- Plymouth Gran Fury (1974–1977)
- Plymouth Fury (1976–1978)
- Plymouth Reliant 2-door (1981–1989)
- Plymouth Volare coupe (1976–1980)
- Toyota Carina Van TA16V/19V (1975–1977)
- Toyota Crown coupe (1979–1983)

== See also ==
- Quarter glass
