= Michigan Township, Indiana =

Michigan Township may refer to the following places in Indiana:

- Michigan Township, Clinton County, Indiana
- Michigan Township, LaPorte County, Indiana

== See also ==
- Michigan Township (disambiguation)
