= Plymouth Reliant =

Dodge Aries Plymouth Reliant
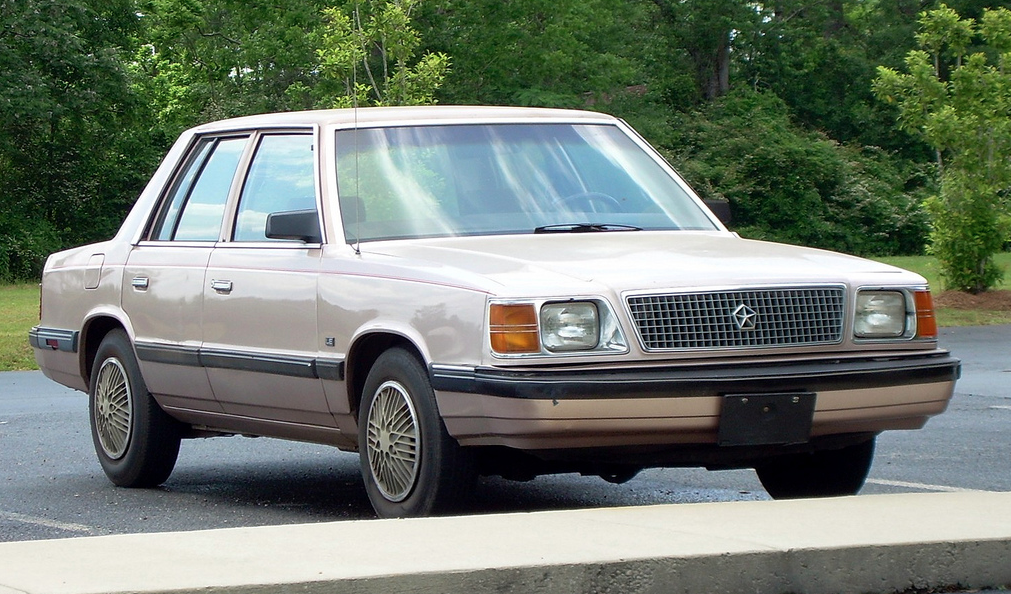
- 1985–1989 Plymouth Reliant sedan

Overview
- Manufacturer: Chrysler Corporation
- Also called: Dodge Dart K/Plymouth Valiant Volare K (Mexico); Dodge Michigan (Japan)
- Production: October 1980 – December 1988
- Model years: 1981–1989
- Assembly: United States: Newark, Delaware (Newark Assembly: sedans and wagons); United States: Detroit, Michigan (Jefferson Avenue Assembly), United States: Fenton, Missouri (Saint Louis Assembly: 2-door sedans only); Mexico: Toluca (Toluca Car Assembly)

Body and chassis
- Class: Mid-size car
- Body style: 2-door coupe (1981–1989); 4-door sedan (1981–1989); 4-door wagon (1981–1988)
- Layout: Transverse front-engine, front-wheel drive
- Platform: K-body
- Related: Chrysler LeBaron; Chrysler Town & Country; Dodge 400

Powertrain
- Engine: 2.2 L K I4; 2.5 L K I4; 2.6 L Mitsubishi G54B I4
- Transmission: 4-speed A460 manual 5-speed A465 manual 5-speed A520 manual 5-speed A525 manual 3-speed A413 automatic 3-speed A470 automatic

Dimensions
- Wheelbase: 100.3 in (2,548 mm); Wagon: 100.4 in (2,550 mm)
- Length: 178.6 in (4,536 mm); Wagon: 178.5 in (4,534 mm)
- Width: 68.0 in (1,727 mm)
- Height: Sedan: 52.9 in (1,344 mm); Coupe: 52.5 in (1,334 mm); Wagon: 53.2 in (1,351 mm)
- Curb weight: 2,300 lb (1,043 kg)

Chronology
- Predecessor: Dodge Aspen / Plymouth Volaré
- Successor: Dodge Spirit / Plymouth Acclaim

The Plymouth Reliant and Dodge Aries are mid-size cars introduced for model year 1981 as the first "K-cars" manufactured and marketed by the Chrysler Corporation. The Reliant and Aries were the smallest cars to have the traditional 6 passenger 2 bench seat with column shifter seating arrangement favored by customers in the United States (Chrysler marketed the car as being able to seat "six Americans"), similar to larger rear-wheel drive cars such as the Dodge Dart and other front-wheel drive cars such as the Chevrolet Celebrity. The Reliant was powered by a then-new 2.2 L I4 SOHC engine, with a Mitsubishi "Silent Shaft" 2.6 L as an option (this engine also featured hemispherical combustion chambers, and all 1981 models equipped with it featured "HEMI" badges on the front fenders). The Reliant was available as a 2-door coupe, 4-door sedan, or as a 4-door station wagon, in three different trim lines: base, Custom and SE ("Special Edition"). Station wagons came only in Custom or SE trim.

As rebadged variants, the Reliant and Aries were manufactured in Newark, Delaware, Detroit, Michigan, and Toluca, Mexico — in a single generation. After their introduction, the Reliant and Aries were marketed as the "Reliant K" and "Aries K". The Aries was sold as the Dart K in Mexico, and as the Michigan in Japan. The Reliant replaced the Plymouth Volaré/Road Runner, while the Aries replaced the Dodge Aspen.

The Reliant and Aries were selected together as Motor Trend magazine's Car of the Year for 1981. Initial sales were brisk, with both Reliant and Aries each selling over 150,000 units in 1981, with cumulative sales of million Aries and 1.1 million Reliant units over the nine-year run.

== History ==
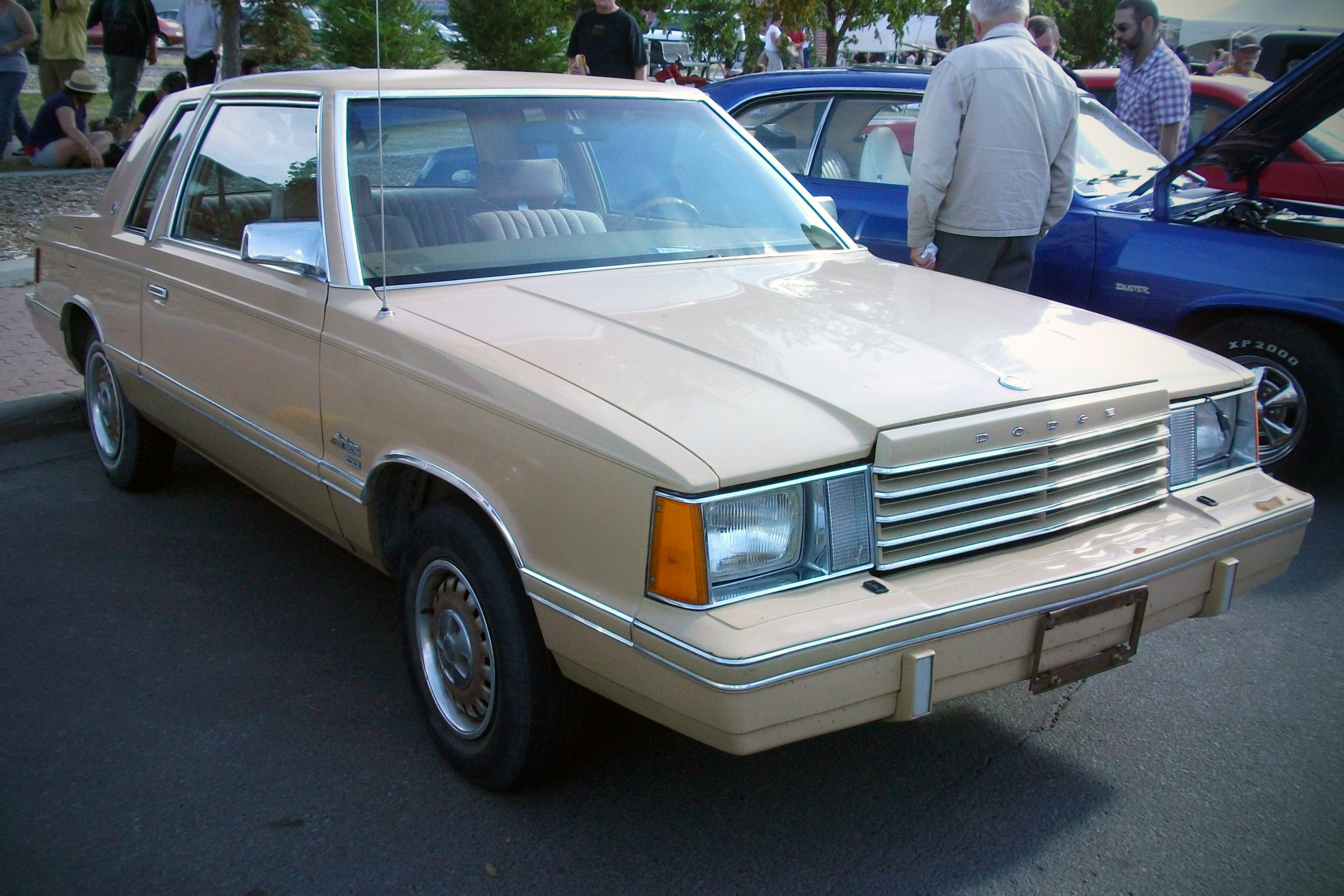
1981 Dodge Aries coupe

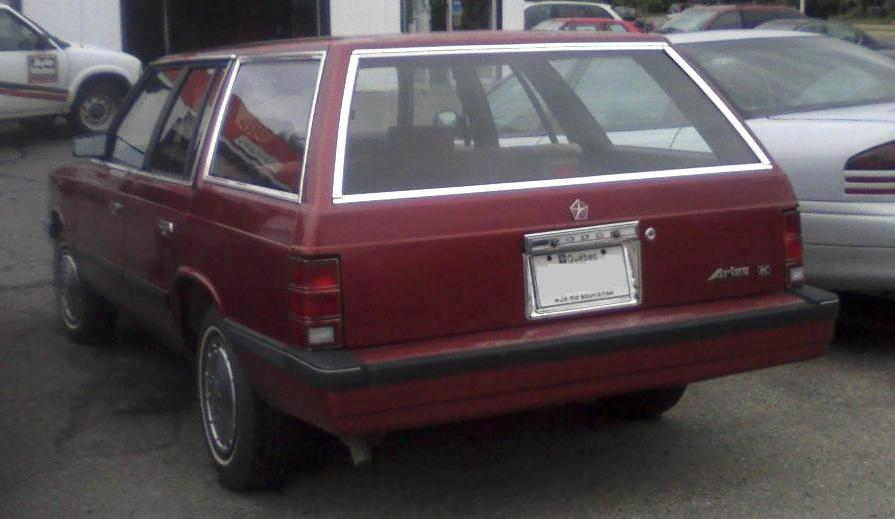
1986–1988 Dodge Aries wagon

Chrysler was facing a grave financial crisis due to poor business decisions, lack of investment in new products during previous years, and external factors outside of their control as the 1970s ended. Lynn A. Townsend, chairman from 1967 to 1975, had pursued a hands-off policy of running the company, refusing to spend more than the minimum on new drivetrains or platforms as long as the existing ones continued to sell. Sales of the company's larger cars started dropping after the 1973 OPEC Embargo and an increased amount of company volume consisted of lower profit compact models. Chrysler also had a policy of producing cars regardless of whether a customer ordered them, which was in contrast to AMC, Ford, and GM who only produced vehicles for which they received orders. Soon, they were left with a backlog of unsold inventory which cost money to store and had to resort to the money-losing tactic of rebates to get rid of these excess cars. Compounding these difficulties were new Federal emissions and safety regulations during the 1970s which added more to the production costs of each car. Townsend retired in 1975 and left the reins to John J. Riccardo, who presided over a slowly-sinking company.

The following year, the compact Dodge Aspen/Plymouth Volare debuted as replacements for the dated Dodge Dart/Plymouth Valiant, but were rushed into production and ended up with a major string of quality control problems that led to them being one of the most recalled cars in US history. In 1977, Riccardo petitioned newly elected US president Jimmy Carter for a Federal bailout, but Carter would not consider the idea as long as Chrysler's present management was in charge. In January 1978, Chrysler released the Dodge Omni/Plymouth Horizon, a US adaption of the European Simca Horizon and the first domestic-built FWD subcompacts. They came out in a year when larger cars were in demand and dealers struggled to move them from lots, costing the hard-pressed company yet more money. Ford president Lee Iacocca was fired on July 13, 1978, and three months later, Chrysler offered him the position of company president. By this point, the smallest of the Big Three American automakers was close to collapse, struggling from the unexpected poor sales of the Omni, the fallout from the Aspen recalls, and the decision to discontinue full-sized Dodges and Plymouths in 1978, leaving it without a full-sized car in a year of strong sales for them. Since 1976, quality control on Chrysler vehicles had become worse.

Although the K-platform had been designed during 1978, the failing company could not afford by this point to put them into production. Thus, Iacocca and Riccardo decided to repeat the original 1977 request for government assistance, but since the Carter Administration would not offer any help until the existing management was removed, Riccardo stepped down as chairman and gave Iacocca the job. During a series of Congressional hearings, Lee Iacocca made his case for a Federal bailout of Chrysler, citing past bailouts of the railroad industry and aerospace company Lockheed as precedent. He argued that thousands of American jobs would be saved and the company had been consciously attempting to build modern, economical cars such as the Omni, but fate had dealt them a bad hand. Iacocca also stated that excessive government regulations were costing needless money. Congress approved the bailout after Chrysler detailed the plans for their new FWD platform and the first handful of K-cars trickled off the assembly line at Detroit's Jefferson Avenue plant in late 1980.

The Reliant and Aries were downsized replacements for the six-passenger Volare and Aspen, which in turn were modernized version of the original Valiant and Dart compact cars of the 1960s. Based on experience gained with subcompact Omni/Horizon of 1978, the roomier K-cars set out to build a family sized car with a front-wheel drive design powered by a four-cylinder engine. They were offered as two- and four-door notchback sedans and four-door wagons and retained six-passenger seating on two bench seats. While the Chevrolet Citation introduced front-wheel drive in the 1980 model year to replace the Nova, its unusual styling and problems with recalls hampered its success. The two original nameplates achieved nearly a million in sales between them before being rebadged and upgraded, not counting the numerous stretched, sporty, or minivan derivatives. Ford did not replace its family-sized Fairmont/Granada/LTD with a front-wheel drive design until the 1986 Ford Taurus, while cars like the Chevrolet Cavalier and Ford Tempo were marketed as upscale compacts rather than family sedans.

Initial advertisements for the Aries were done in red, white, and blue and emphasized American industry's desire to answer the challenge of Japanese products and also promoted the low $5,880 base price. Since Chrysler was so financially strapped, early promotional shots featured the same car, but with Dodge and Plymouth badges and trim swapped. In 1981, sales of the Reliant and Aries got off to a slow, but early start and can be attributed to Chrysler's inadequate preparation. Instead of producing a sufficient amount of base models, Chrysler was producing a larger number of SE and Custom models. When consumers arrived at Plymouth (and Dodge) dealers, they were shocked to find that the Reliant they were planning on purchasing would end up costing hundreds or thousands of dollars more. As a result of this, Chrysler corrected this and began building more base models and sales of the Reliant and Aries skyrocketed.

The Reliant and Aries were available in standard "base", mid-level Custom, and high-end SE (later renamed LE) trim levels. Unlike the coupe and sedan, the station wagon was not available in base trim. "SE" Reliant/Aries wagons came standard with exterior woodtone siding, although it could be deleted. All models except base could be ordered with front bucket seats rather than the standard bench. By 1987, though, bucket seats became standard and bench seats were optional without charge.

Peak sales were reached in the first year, with another high in 1984, but in spite of the 1986 facelift they decreased steadily in the succeeding years. With sales down 19% part way through 1987, Chrysler announced massive price cuts (of up to 16%) and a whittling down of the range to two models, offering a limited number of options. Since the tooling and other fixed costs were long ago amortized for the aging design, Chrysler would still earn money on the Aries/Reliant. Sales shot up for 1988 and the car was still selling strong during the partial 1989 model year.

== Changes through the years ==
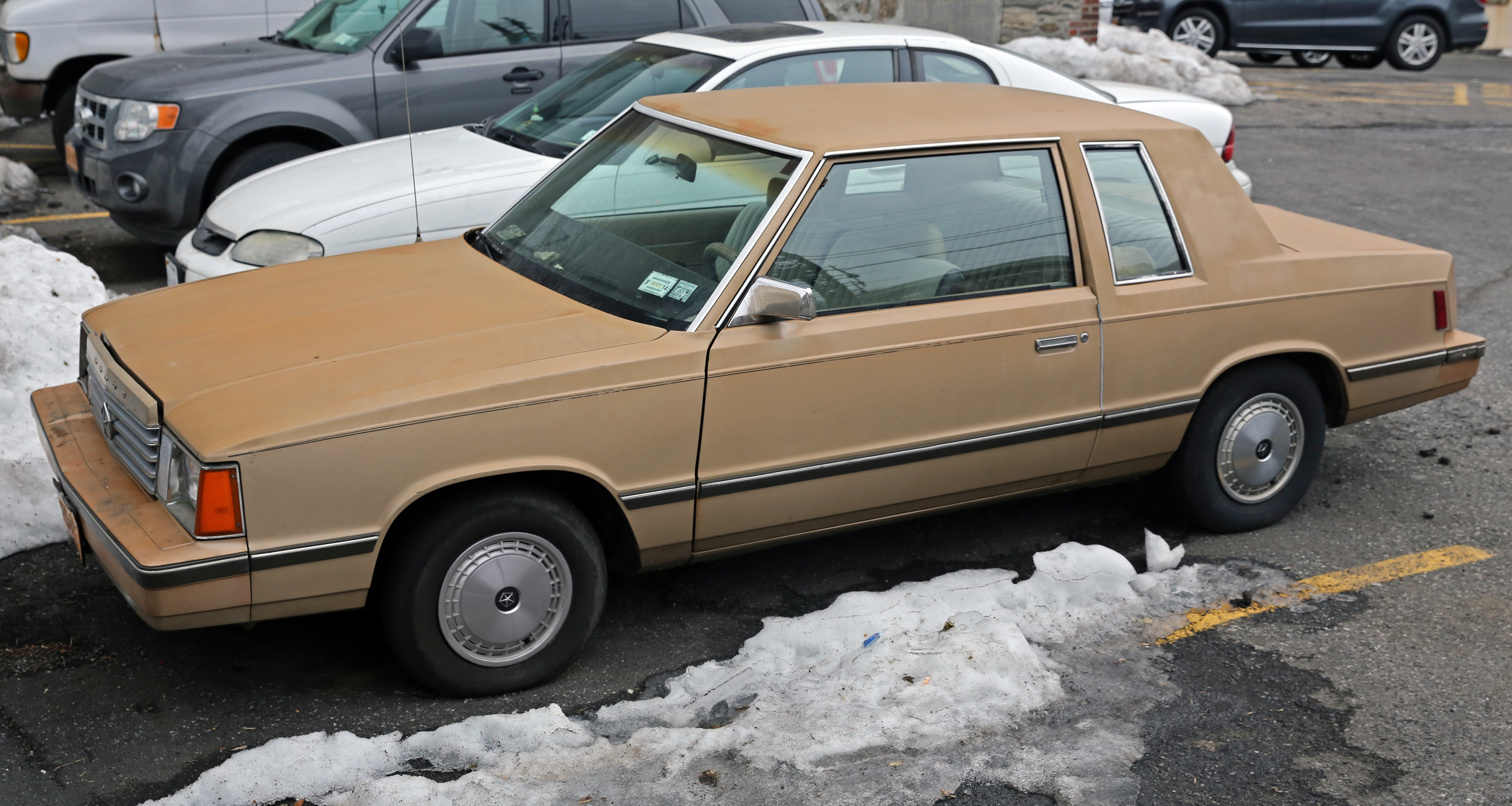
1982–1984 Dodge Aries coupe

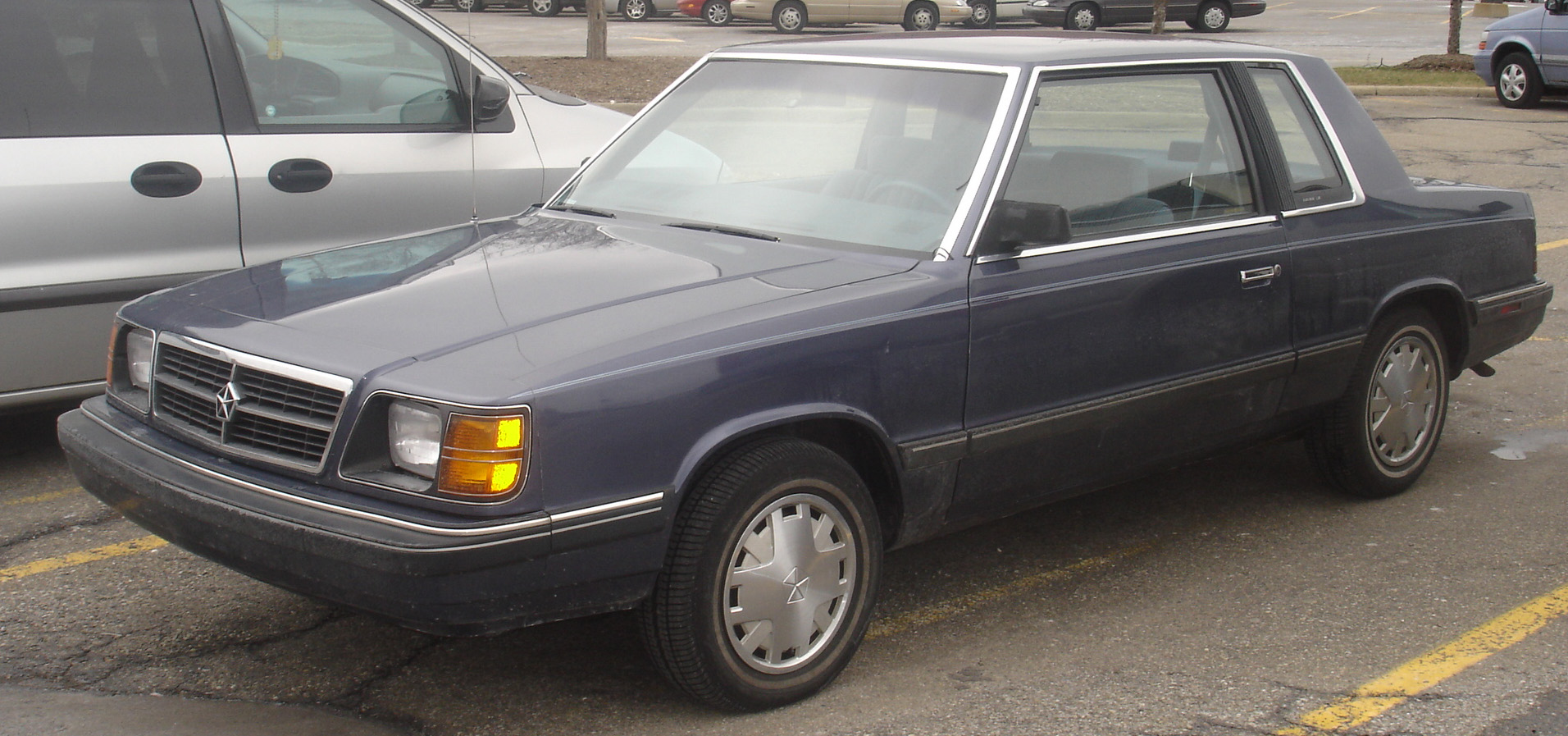
1985–1989 Dodge Aries coupe

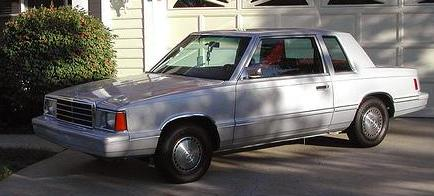
1983 Plymouth Reliant coupe

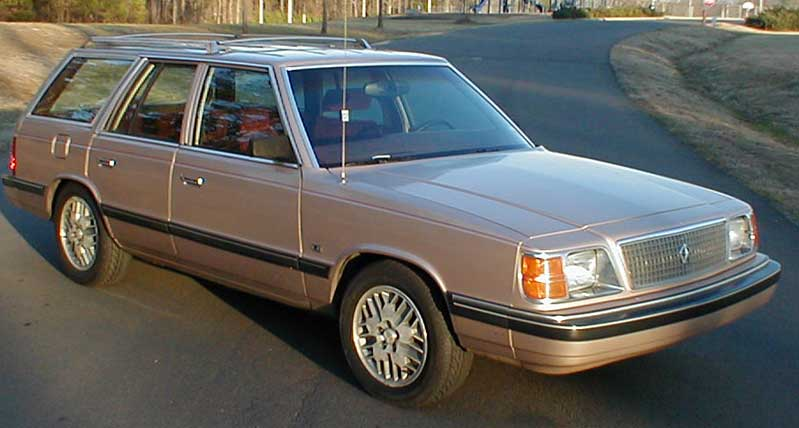
1988 Plymouth Reliant wagon

- 1982: A new hood ornament (changed from either a Plymouth "frog legs" hood ornament or a Dodge badge mounted flat on the hood to an upright Chrysler Pentastar), a counterbalanced hood, and black painted valve cover on the 2.2L engine (vs. the former blue). 1981 and 1982 were the only two years when a factory installed sunroof on coupes and sedans could be ordered. Actual production numbers are not known.
- 1983: A blacked out grille is made standard on the Aries. Also, the four-door sedan and station wagon models finally received roll-down rear door windows versus the former stationary glass with rear quarter pop-out panes.
- 1984: The hood ornament was removed and the Chrysler Pentastar moved to the grille; the Mercedes-Benz-styled grille used on the Reliant was modified. Also, the tail lights received chrome trim, and the interior received a padded dash and new black instrument cluster with round gauges that were functionally improved with the addition of a trip meter and replacing the engine and generator signals with temperature and voltage gauges and a distinct oil signal.
- 1985: The first major changes occurred when the Ks received a new, rounder front fascia, featuring either a new egg-crate or crosshair grille for the Plymouth and Dodge that was the same height as the headlights (rather than going all the way up to the hood as with previous model years). A new rear fascia featuring five-section taillights. A new trim line, the top-tier LE ("Luxury Edition"), was added (it also replaced the Custom trim level on the wagon). The base engine was a transverse mounted, Chrysler-designed, 2.2-litre (134 cu in) inline-four engine with an electronic two-barrel carburetor (replaced by a fuel injection system in 1986), rated at 82 hp (61 kW). Transaxles were a four-speed floor shift manual or a three-speed automatic with either a floor or column shift. A Mitsubishi motor was optional (automatic transmission was required with that engine), and cars so equipped for 1981 were badged "2.6 Hemi". Reliants and Aries equipped with this engine accelerated 0–60 mph in the 13-second range.
- 1986: There was the replacement of the 2.2 L engine's carburetor by a new throttle-body electronic fuel injection system, while a new 2.5 L four-cylinder engine, also fuel-injected, was added to the option list, replacing the Mitsubishi 2.6 L G54B engine, but driveability and reliability problems led to its replacement. (Just like the 2.6, automatic transmission was mandatory for the 2.5.) The four-speed manual transmission – previously offered as standard equipment – was dropped. The SE trim line was dropped, and the LE and base trim remained the only trims until the end of production.
- 1988: All Reliant models were renamed Reliant America in the U.S., and Reliant Canada, in Canada, and was offered in one "LE" trim level. This marketing strategy was also practiced with the Dodge Omni America/Plymouth Horizon America in 1988, and as a separate base series for the Dodge Shadow/Plymouth Sundance twins for 1992. It is also the last year for the station wagons.

After 1987, the Reliant and Aries underwent only minor changes throughout the rest of its production run. The last K-car rolled off the assembly line on December 9, 1988. The 1989 Reliant and Aries were carryovers from the 1988 model year and only the America and Canada trims were available on these models. No station wagon models were sold in 1989. The Reliant was replaced by the Acclaim for 1989, while the Aries was replaced by the Spirit.

== Engines ==
Engine	Displacement	Power	Torque	Years
2.2 inline-4	2,213 cc (135.0 cu in)	85 hp (63 kW) @ 4400	111 lb⋅ft (150 N⋅m) @ 2800	1981–1982
2.2 inline-4	2,213 cc (135.0 cu in)	94 hp (70 kW) @ 5200	117 lb⋅ft (159 N⋅m) @ 3200	1983–1985
2.2 EFi inline-4	2,213 cc (135.0 cu in)	97 hp (72 kW) @ 5200	122 lb⋅ft (165 N⋅m) @ 3200	1986–1987
2.2 EFi inline-4	2,213 cc (135.0 cu in)	93 hp (69 kW) @ 4800	122 lb⋅ft (165 N⋅m) @ 3200	1988–1989
2.5 EFi inline-4	2,501 cc (152.6 cu in)	100 hp (75 kW) @ 4800	136 lb⋅ft (184 N⋅m) @ 2800	1986–1989
2.6 inline-4	2,555 cc (155.9 cu in)	92 hp (69 kW) @ 4500	131 lb⋅ft (178 N⋅m) @ 2500	1981–1983
2.6 inline-4	2,555 cc (155.9 cu in)	101 hp (75 kW) @ 4800	140 lb⋅ft (190 N⋅m) @ 2800	1984–1985

== Production ==
Dodge Aries production figures
	Coupe	Sedan	Wagon	Yearly total
1981	114,631		41,150	155,781
1982	19,787	52,268	32,608	104,663
1983	18,543	60,745	33,251	112,539
1984	16,152	67,645	36,235	120,032
1985	21,071	69,432	27,472	117,975
1986	13,996	60,337	23,035	97,368
1987	7,721	71,216	20,362	99,299
1988	6,578	85,613	19,172	111,363
1989	3,359	49,837	-	53,196
Total	*	*	233,285	972,216

Plymouth Reliant production figures
	Coupe	Sedan	Wagon	Yearly total
1981	100,137		51,500	151,637
1982	26,965	72,046	40,212	139,223
1983	21,961	82,546	42,055	146,562
1984	19,820	88,818	43,545	152,183
1985	24,957	81,275	31,506	137,738
1986	15,762	79,988	27,255	123,005
1987	9,331	71,717	22,905	103,953
1988	8,543	95,551	22,213	126,307
1989	4,032	48,203	-	52,235
Total	*	*	281,191	1,132,843

* For 1981, coupe and sedan production figures were not listed separately.

== Trim levels ==
- Base: 1981–1987; America/Canada: 1988–1989
- Custom: 1981–1984; LE: 1985–1989
- SE: 1981–1986
