= Dodge 400 =

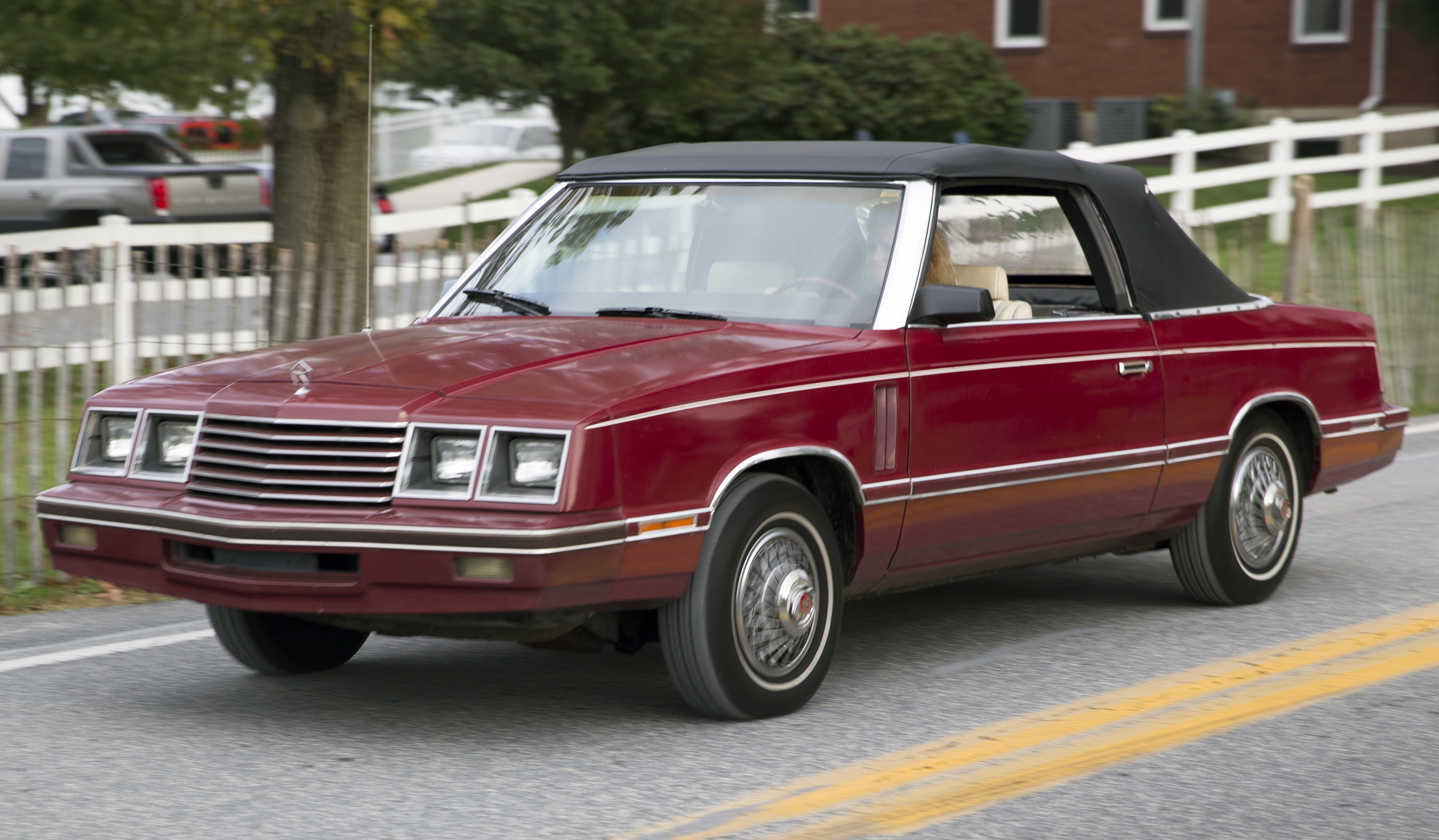
- 1983 Dodge 400 convertible

Overview
- Manufacturer: Chrysler Corporation
- Production: 1981–1983
- Model years: 1982–1983
- Assembly: United States: Fenton, Missouri (Saint Louis Assembly)

Body and chassis
- Class: Mid-size
- Body style: 2-door coupe; 2-door convertible; 4-door sedan
- Layout: FF layout
- Platform: K-body
- Related: Chrysler LeBaron; Dodge Aries; Plymouth Reliant

Powertrain
- Engine: 2.2 L K I4; 2.6 L Mitsubishi G54B I4
- Transmission: 4-speed manual; 5-speed manual; 3-speed A413 automatic; 3-speed A470 automatic

Dimensions
- Wheelbase: 100.3 in (2,548 mm)
- Length: 179.2 in (4,552 mm)
- Width: 68 in (1,727 mm)
- Height: 52.9 in (1,344 mm)
- Curb weight: 2,465–2,542 lb (1,118–1,153 kg)

Chronology
- Successor: Dodge 600

The Dodge 400 is a mid-size car that was sold by Dodge for the 1982 and 1983 model years. The Dodge counterpart of the Chrysler LeBaron, the 400 bridged the gap between the Dodge Aries and the larger Dodge 600. Marketed as a personal luxury vehicle, the 400 was sold as a two-door coupe and convertible and a four-door sedan. Alongside its Chrysler counterpart, the model line marked the return of American-brand convertibles to mass production.

Sharing the Chrysler K platform with the Dodge Aries, the 400 was known both internally and externally as a "Super K" car, developed as premium-content variants.

For its production, Chrysler assembled the Dodge 400 alongside the Chrysler LeBaron, Dodge Aries, and Plymouth Reliant at its Saint Louis Assembly facility (Fenton, Missouri). One of the shortest-lived model lines ever produced by Chrysler, the Dodge 400 was discontinued for 1984 with its coupe and convertible variants becoming part of the Dodge 600 line.

== Design overview ==
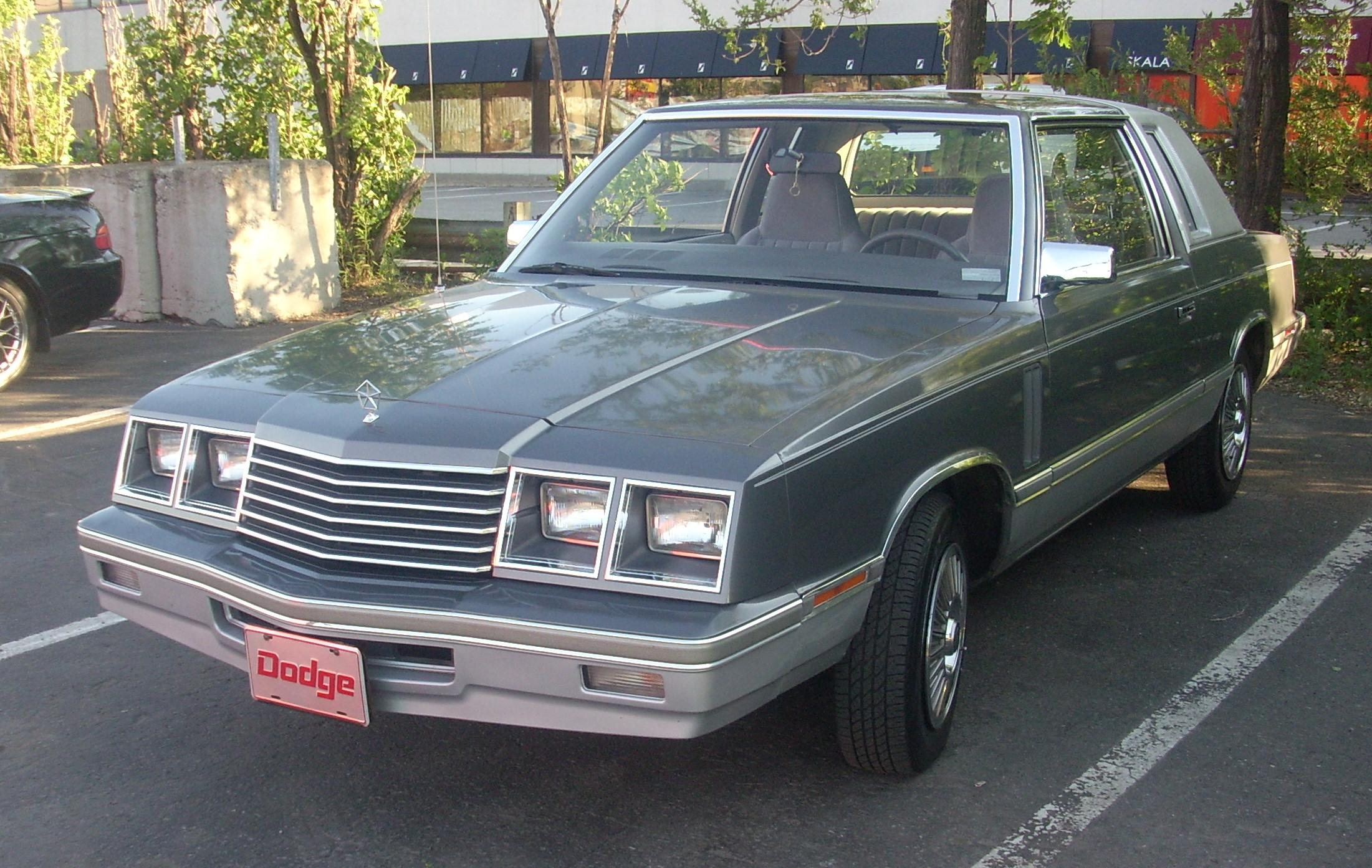
1982 Dodge 400 LS coupe

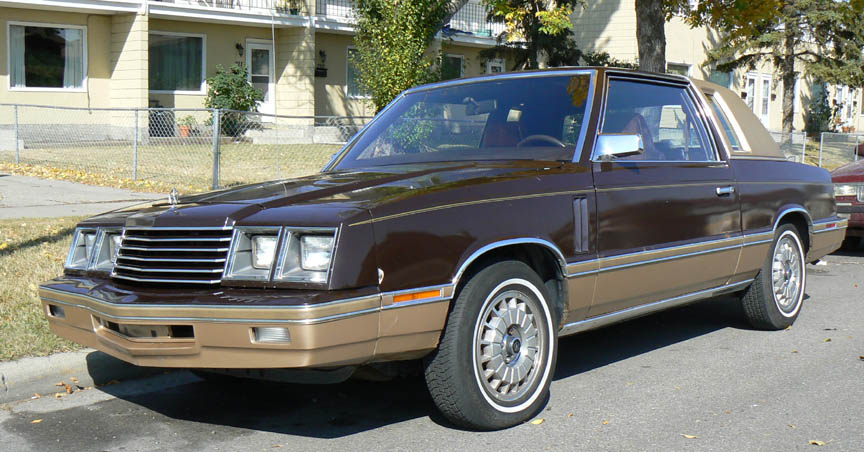
1983 Dodge 400 coupe

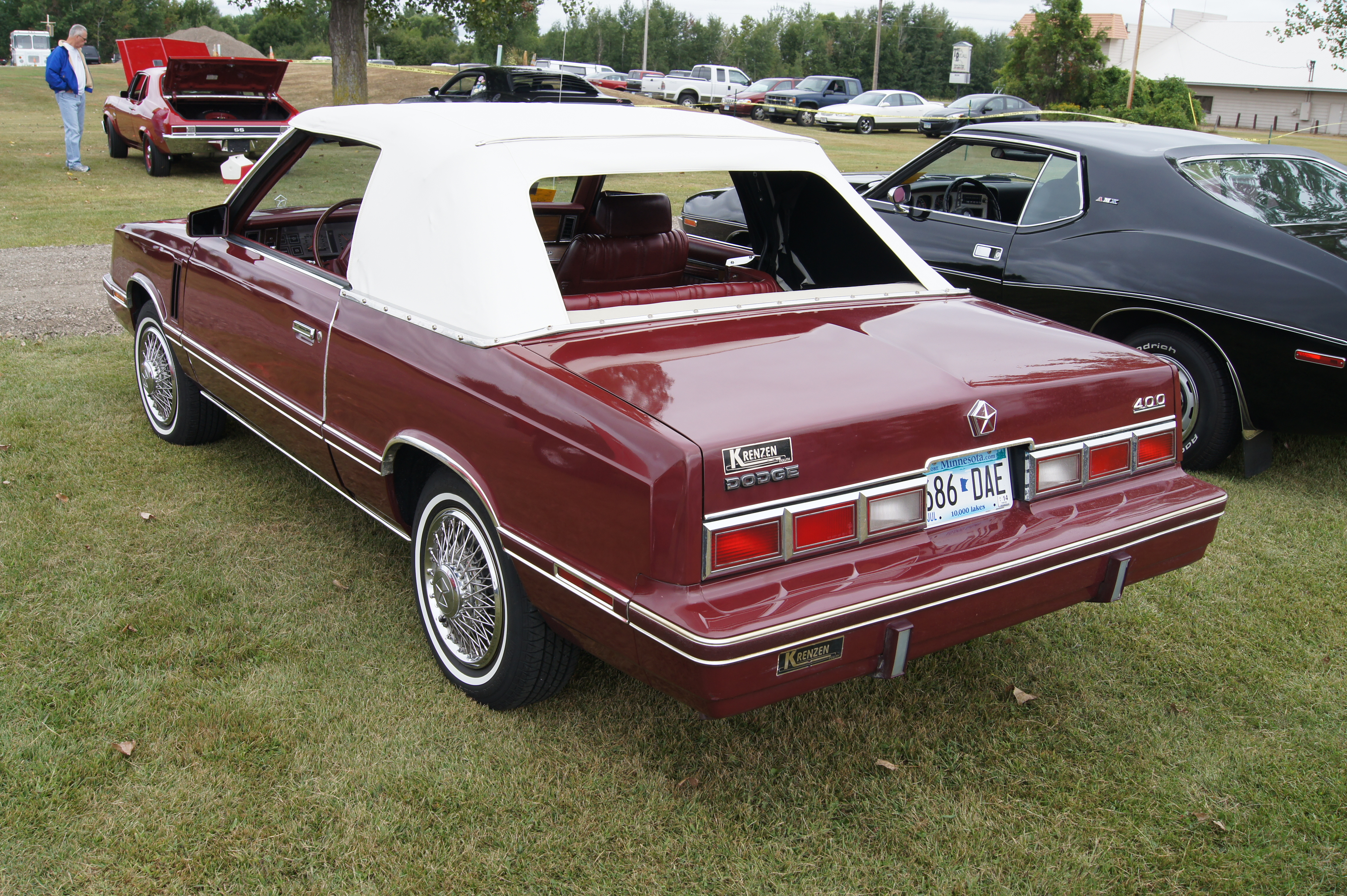
1982 Dodge 400 convertible (top raised, rear window removed)

In evolving its mainstream Dodge Aries into the "Super K" Dodge 400, Chrysler relied on the use of computer-aided design (CAD) for several revisions. In one of its first major uses of the technology, CAD was used to design and tune suspension components and design new body panels for the model line. A central objective was upgrading soundproofing (over the Aries/Reliant), leading to a complete redesign of the firewall. Other changes involved additional soundproofing around the A-pillars and between the trunk and passenger compartment, along with the steering column mounting; other soundproofing improvements came from upgraded (quieter) suspension bushings.

=== Chassis ===
The Dodge 400 utilizes the front-wheel drive Chrysler K platform, sharing its 100.3 inch wheelbase with the Dodge Aries/Plymouth Reliant and the Chrysler LeBaron sedan and convertible. The 400 shared its MacPherson strut/beam axle suspension configuration with the Aries, but added a front sway bar and featured revised suspension tuning; though retuned for a softer ride over the Aries, the 400 was also given a sportier feel than its Chrysler LeBaron counterpart. The brakes utilized the same disc/drum configuration as the rest of the K-car line.

The model line was fitted with a 84 hp (63 kW) 2.2 L inline-4, with a 92 hp (69 kW) 2.6 L inline-4 offered as an option. The 2.2 L engine was offered with a 4-speed manual transmission as standard and an optional 3-speed automatic; the 2.6 L engine (the only engine for convertibles) was offered only with the automatic.

=== Body ===
Sharing its underlying structure with the Dodge Aries (along with most of its major exterior body panels) , the Dodge 400 was distinguished from its Aries/Reliant counterpart by its prow-shaped front fascia, slatted grille, and heavily recessed headlamps (borrowing somewhat from the Dodge Mirada); though styled similar to the Aries, the rear fascia of the 400 was fitted with chrome-trimmed taillamps. Contrasting with the crystal-style Pentastar hood ornament of the LeBaron, the 400 was fitted with an open-style Pentastar (similar to the Aries and later Dodge Caravan).

The Dodge 400 coupe and sedan were fitted with a standard vinyl roof, with frenched rear and side windows on the coupe; as on the LeBaron, a full-length vinyl roof covered the quarter glass in the rear doors. Though styled slightly different from their previous appearance on the Mirada, the front fenders were styled with (non-functional) louvers.

==== Convertible ====
Based on the two-door coupe, the Dodge 400/Chrysler LeBaron convertibles were completed by licensed bodybuilder Cars and Concepts. The first American-brand convertibles that were mass-produced since the 1976 Cadillac Eldorado (the first Dodge convertibles since the 1971 Challenger), the Super K convertibles were fitted with reinforced A-pillars along with a torque tube connected to reinforced portions of the front and rear unibody. In contrast to the majority of coupes and sedans, convertibles were fitted exclusively with a vinyl-upholstery interior.

The Dodge 400 convertible is distinguished from subsequent Chrysler K and J platform convertibles by its lack of rear side windows.

== Model years ==
=== 1982 ===
For its launch, the Dodge 400 was offered solely as a two-door coupe. Approximately halfway through the model year, the model line was expanded by the addition of the two-door convertible and four-door sedan; the 400 was never sold as a 5-door station wagon.

The model line was offered in two trims: 400 and the upgraded 400 LS; the LS was fitted with upgraded seat upholstery and door panel trim.

=== 1983 ===
For 1983, the 400 LS was dropped, leaving the model line under one trim level. The powertrain underwent several revisions, with a 5-speed manual replacing the previous 4-speed unit. The 2.2 L and 2.6 L engines were both retuned, increasing output to 94 hp (70 kW) and 93 hp (69 kW), respectively. Replacing both the LS and the previous sport-appearance options was a Roadability option package, which included a firmer-tuned suspension, quicker-ratio steering, and higher-grip tires.

The interior saw a redesigned instrument cluster (with an optional trip computer); Chrysler's Electronic Voice Alert system was introduced as an option, which informed drivers (through a computer-generated voice) of several different safety and mechanical issues.

Through several different production revisions, the price of the 400 convertible was reduced by nearly $3000 (approximately $9297 in current money). To do so, 14-inch wheels and whitewall tires were made optional, along with the fitment of power steering.

== Discontinuation ==
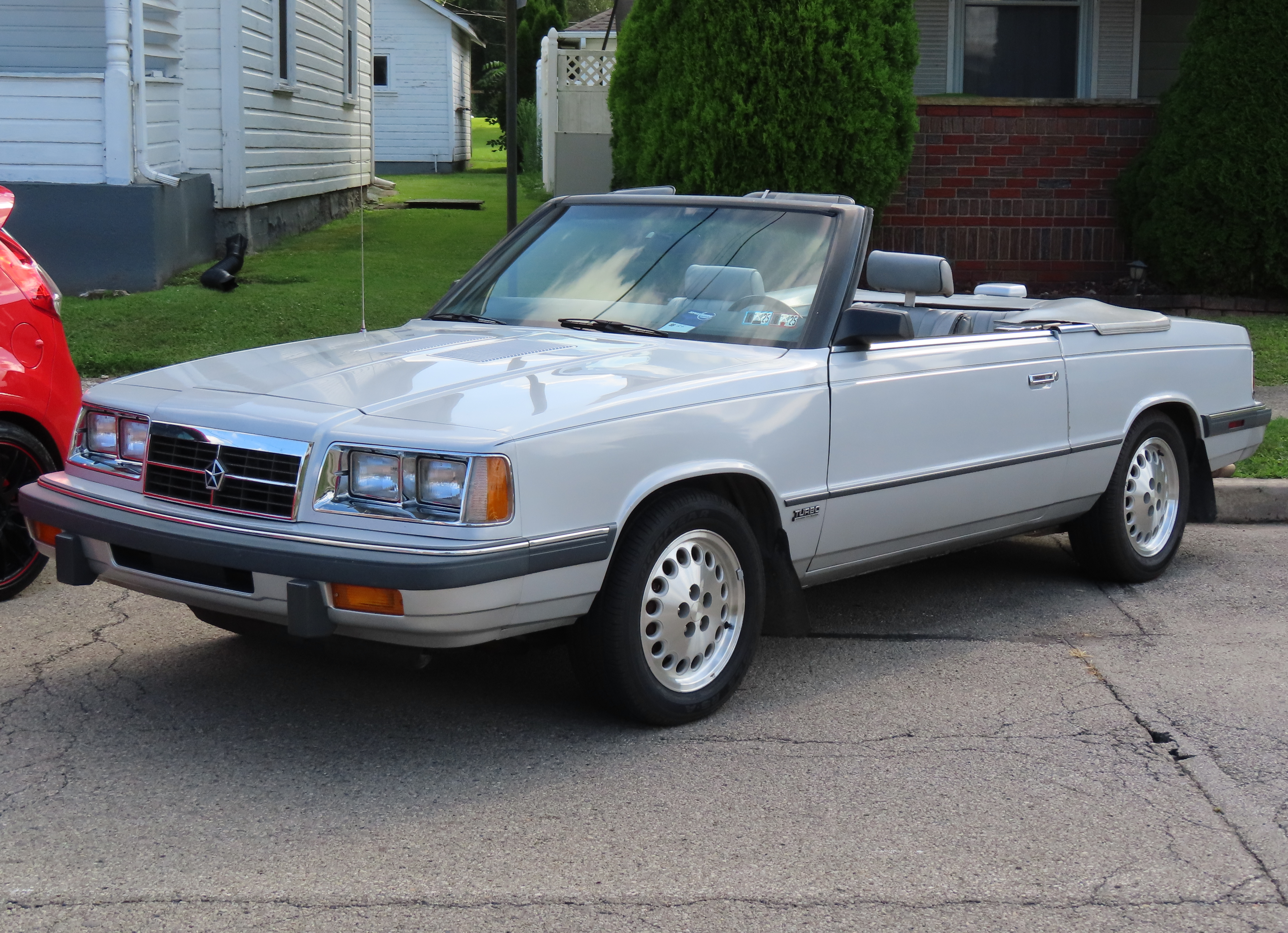
1986 Dodge 600 ES Turbo convertible (last year of production)

For 1984, Dodge phased out the 400 model line. The four-door sedan was discontinued altogether, with the coupe and convertible living on as part of the Dodge 600 line, joining the E-platform sedan). While the 600 coupe saw primarily badging changes, the convertible underwent larger changes, as the top was redesigned, adding roll-down quarter glass and a larger rear seat.

For the 1986 model year, the entire 600 line underwent a major exterior redesign, dropping the Mirada-style grille and recessed quad headlamps for softer-edge fenders, a "crosshair" grille, and headlamp units with wraparound parking lamps.

For 1987, Dodge dropped the 600 coupe and convertible as the J-platform Chrysler LeBaron was introduced with no divisional counterparts. During 1988, the 600 sedan would be replaced by the Dodge Dynasty.

== Production ==
Production figures:

Dodge 400 Production Figures
	Coupe	Sedan	Convertible	Yearly Total
1982	19,443	6,465	5,541	31,449
1983	11,504	9,560	4,888	25,952
Total	30,947	16,025	10,429	57,401
