= Michigan City station (disambiguation) =

Michigan City station is a train station in Michigan City, Indiana, serving Amtrak.

Michigan City station may also refer to:

- Michigan City Generating Station, a power plant in Michigan City, Indiana
- 11th Street station (South Shore Line), a South Shore Line station in Michigan City, Indiana
- Carroll Avenue station, a South Shore Line station in Michigan City, Indiana
- Willard Avenue station, a former South Shore Line station in Michigan City, Indiana

== See also ==
- Michigan City (disambiguation)
