= Virgil Boyd =

American businessman (1912–2011)

- Born: Virgil Edward Boyd; July 8, 1912; Benton, Kansas, U.S.
- Died: February 11, 2011 (aged 98); Sedona, Arizona, U.S.
- Education: American Business College
- Occupation: Former Chrysler president
- Years active: 1931–1972
- Spouse: Bernice Nelson (m. 1935; died 2006)
- Children: 2

Virgil Edward Boyd (July 8, 1912 – February 16, 2011) was an American automobile executive who was president of the Chrysler Corporation from 1966 to 1970 and vice chairman from 1970 to 1972.

== Early life ==
Boyd was born July 8, 1912, on a farm near Benton, Kansas and grew up outside of Blencoe, Iowa. He grew up close to poverty and his father lost his farm during the Great Depression. Boyd graduated from the American Business College in Omaha, Nebraska in 1931 and went to work in the accounting department of the General Motors Acceptance Corporation.

== Career ==
=== Nash/AMC ===
In 1937, Boyd joined Nash-Kelvinator as manager and comptroller of its Omaha branch office. In 1944, he became manager of the company's central office in Detroit. From 1947 to 1954, he owned and operated dealerships in Sioux City, Iowa and Alliance, Nebraska, first selling Nash vehicles, then switching to Buicks. In 1954, Nash-Kelvinator merged with the Hudson Motor Car Company to form the American Motors Corporation and Boyd was named special assistant to the company's executive vice president, George W. Romney. In 1956, he was appointed general sales manager of AMC's Hudson division. Later that year he was named field sales manager for Hudson, Nash, and Rambler. In 1961, he succeeded Roy Abernethy as vice president in charge of automotive sales.

=== Chrysler ===
In 1962, Lynn A. Townsend took over as president of Chrysler Corporation amid a conflict of interest scandal and lagging sales. Soon thereafter, he brought Boyd on as vice president and general sales manager. He was the company's number three officer behind chairman George H. Love and Townsend. Under Boyd's leadership, Chrysler more than doubled its sales, going from 719,933 vehicles sold in 1961 to 1,612,321 in 1965. Its market share grew from 10.8% to 15.7% during that same time. The number of Chrysler dealerships grew from 5,600 to 6,600 under Boyd.

In 1966, Boyd was promoted to president, with Townsend becoming chairman and remaining chief executive. In 1968, Chrysler had its best sales year to date, which Townsend credited to Boyd's work. Sales dropped sharply the following year and in January 1970, Boyd was removed as president and named to the newly created post of vice chairman, a role that centered around civic and consumer affairs. He retired from Chrysler on September 30, 1972.

=== Other work ===
Outside of the automotive industry, Boyd was a trustee of Grace Hospital, chairman of the board of trustees of Alma College, and a director of Parke-Davis and the Budd Company.

== Later life ==
Boyd and his wife retired to Arizona, residing first in Litchfield Park then in Sedona. Boyd died on February 16, 2011, in Sedona.

Business positions
Preceded by Lynn A. Townsend	President of the Chrysler Corporation; December 1, 1966–January 8, 1970	Succeeded by John J. Riccardo
