= Quarter glass =

Type of car window

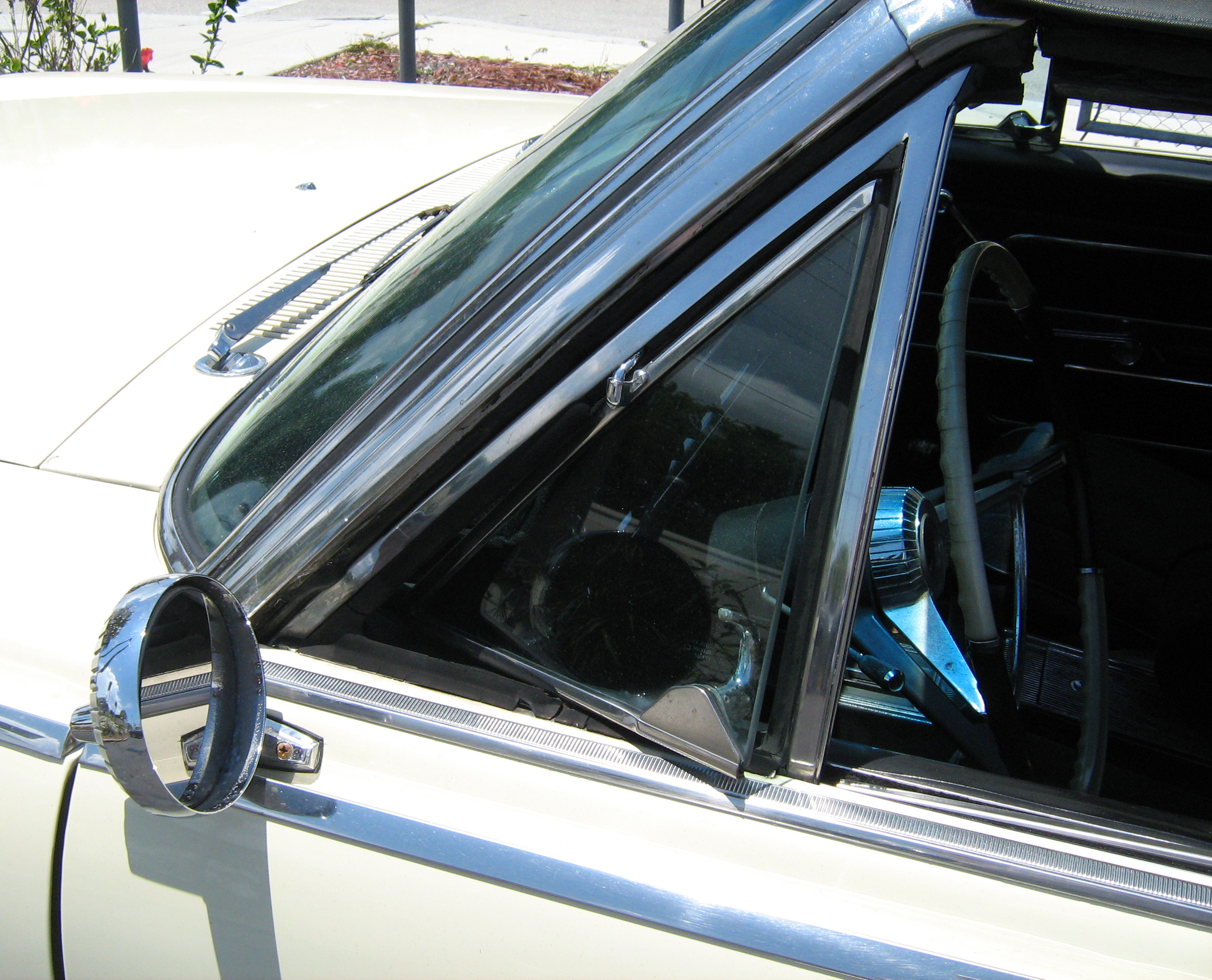
Pivoting quarter "vent" window in a front door

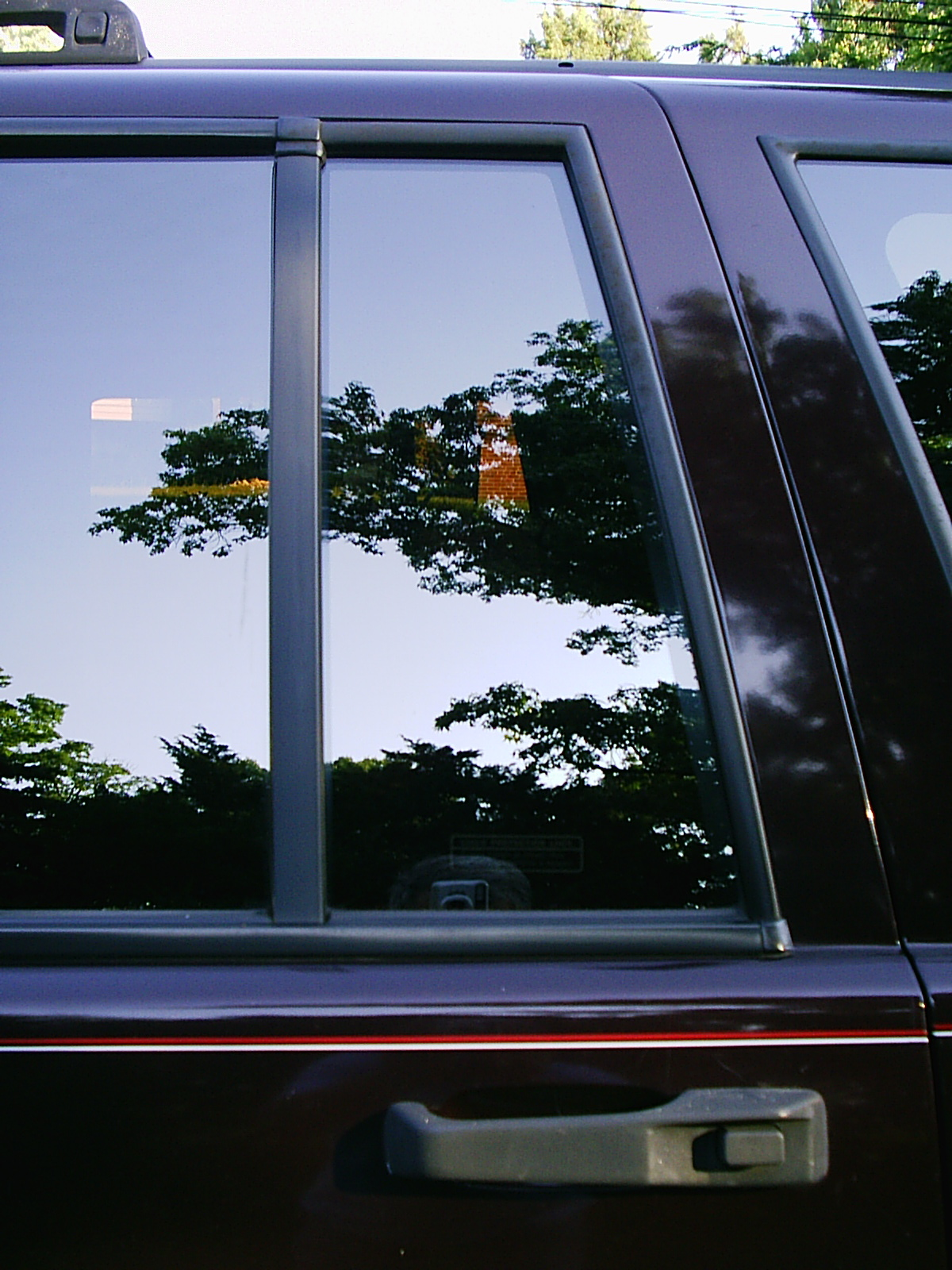
Stationary quarter glass in a rear door

Quarter glass (or quarter light) on automobiles and closed carriages may be a side window in the front door or located on each side of the car just forward of the rear-facing rear window of the vehicle. Only some cars have them. In some cases, the fixed quarter glass may be set in the corner or "C-pillar" of the vehicle. Quarter glass is also sometimes called a valence window.

This window may be set on hinges and is then also known as a vent window, wing window, wing vent window, or a fly window. Most often found on older vehicles on the front doors, it is a small, roughly triangular glass in front of and separate from the main window that rotates inward (see top right image) for ventilation.

== Designs ==
Many early closed cars, such as the 1933 Pontiac Economy Eight, had front and rear vent windows called "ventipanes" and were installed on all GM products that year. They were mounted on hinges and a latch so that they could be opened for additional ventilation. The first year all GM vehicles were equipped with optional vent windows was 1933. Initially called "No Draft Individually Controlled Ventilation," the feature was later renamed "Ventipanes." The patent application was filed on 28 November 1932.. It was assigned to the Ternstedt Manufacturing Company, a GM subsidiary that manufactured components for Fisher Body.

Most vehicles since the 1960s have adopted "ventless" side windows for cleaner styling. Some automakers continued to offer vent windows. The AMC Pacer was available with optional front vent windows for increased flow-through ventilation. Although the front venting windows "provide unmatched ventilation, air turbulence and leakage outweigh the benefits". As automobile air conditioning became more popular, front window vents disappeared by the 1980s.

Lincoln vehicles in the late 1970s and throughout the 1980s had powered vent windows that retracted into the door, similar to a regular car window, before the main window retracted.

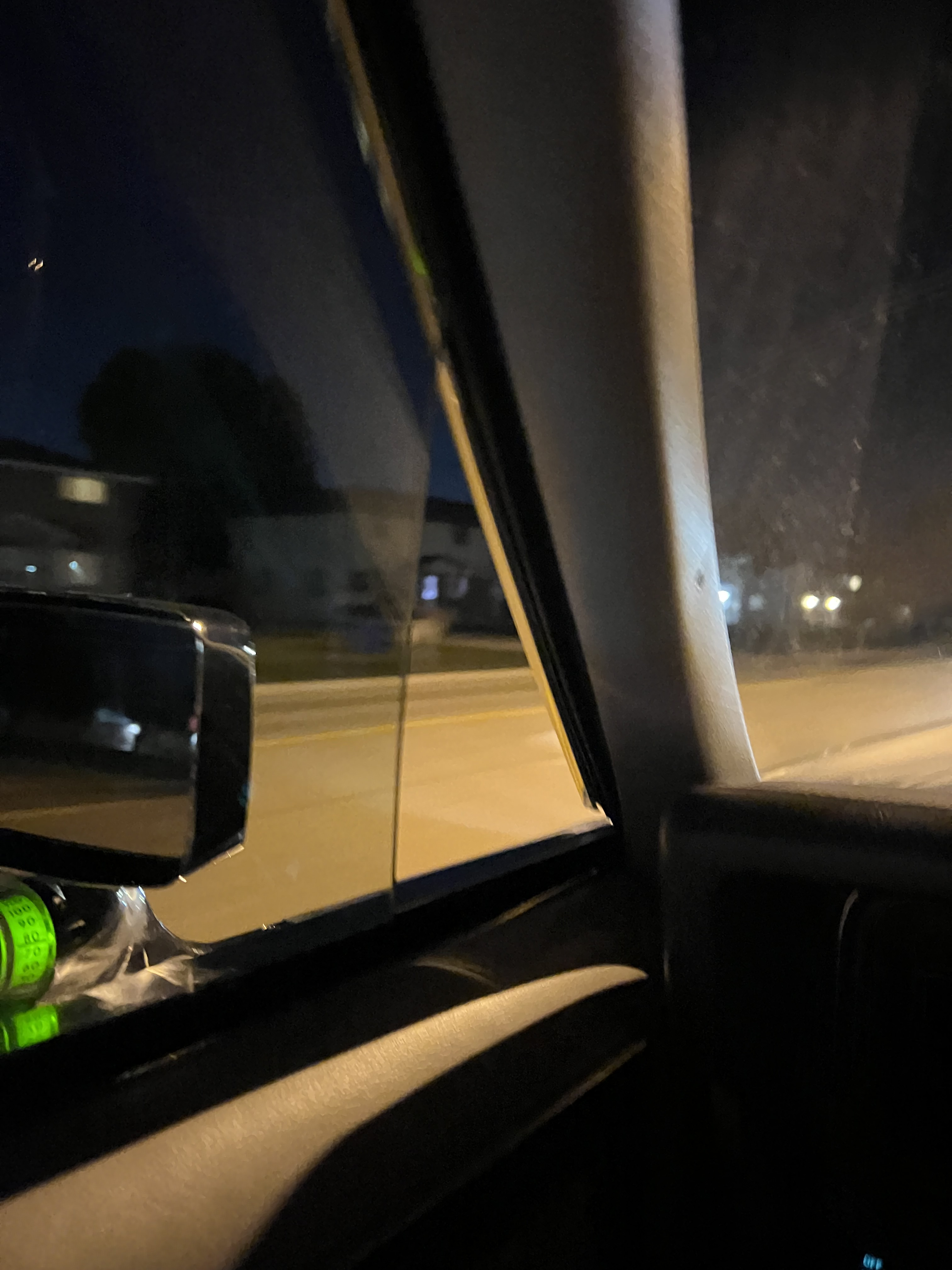
Retracted vent window of a 1979 Lincoln Continental Town Car

The Toyota Century had vent windows that would pivot out and were operated with a dedicated electric switch for the front and a separate vent window in the rear doors. This may be a side window between the B-pillar and the C-pillar, and in the case of United States minivans, between the C and D-pillars (examples include the Chrysler Town and Country power-operated venting glass).

A quarter glass can be found set in the body or A-pillar ahead of the front door opening (examples include the Buick Encore, Chevrolet Lumina APV, Toyota Prius, Opel Astra J, Mitsubishi Endeavor, Fiat Grande Punto, Suzuki SX4 sedan, and the 8th-generation Honda Civic sedan). They are non-movable and mounted in the door itself, as that section of the rear-side glass would not be able to slide down due to the cut-out in the rear doors required to clear the rear wheel housings. The fixed portion of the glass is separated from the main window that rolls down by a slim opaque vertical bar.

In some automobiles, the fixed quarter glass may be set in the corner, or "C-pillar" of the vehicle. Some designs incorporate two quarter windows: one that is part of the door and the second mounted in the roof pillar. This arrangement may help to increase driver visibility. In this case, the quarter glass in the C-pillar would not be called an "opera window". Non-opening, fixed quarter windows are installed like windshields in that they are bonded to the body with urethane.

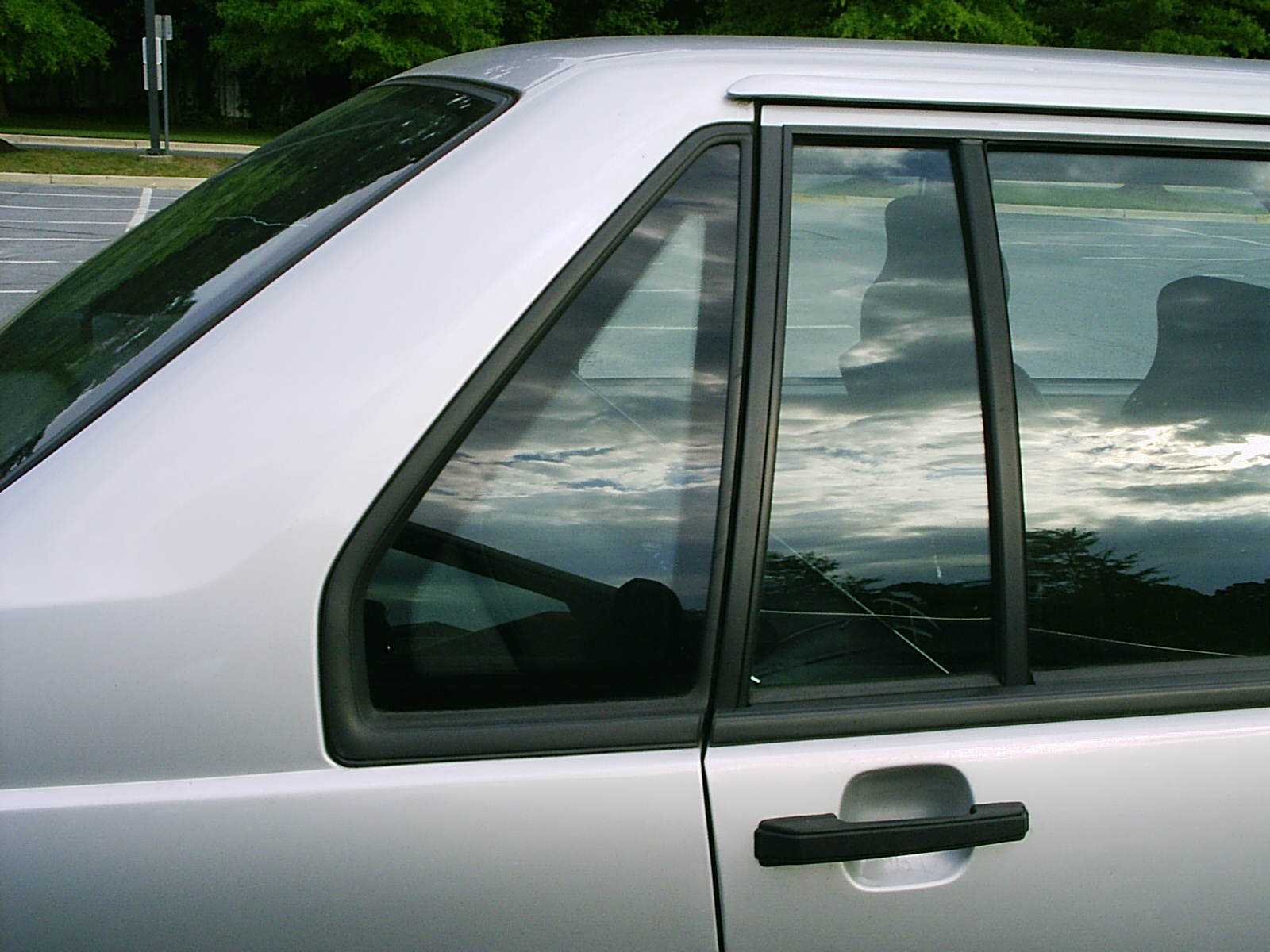
Two non-movable quarter windows of a Volvo 940, one as part of the door and a second mounted in the C-pillar

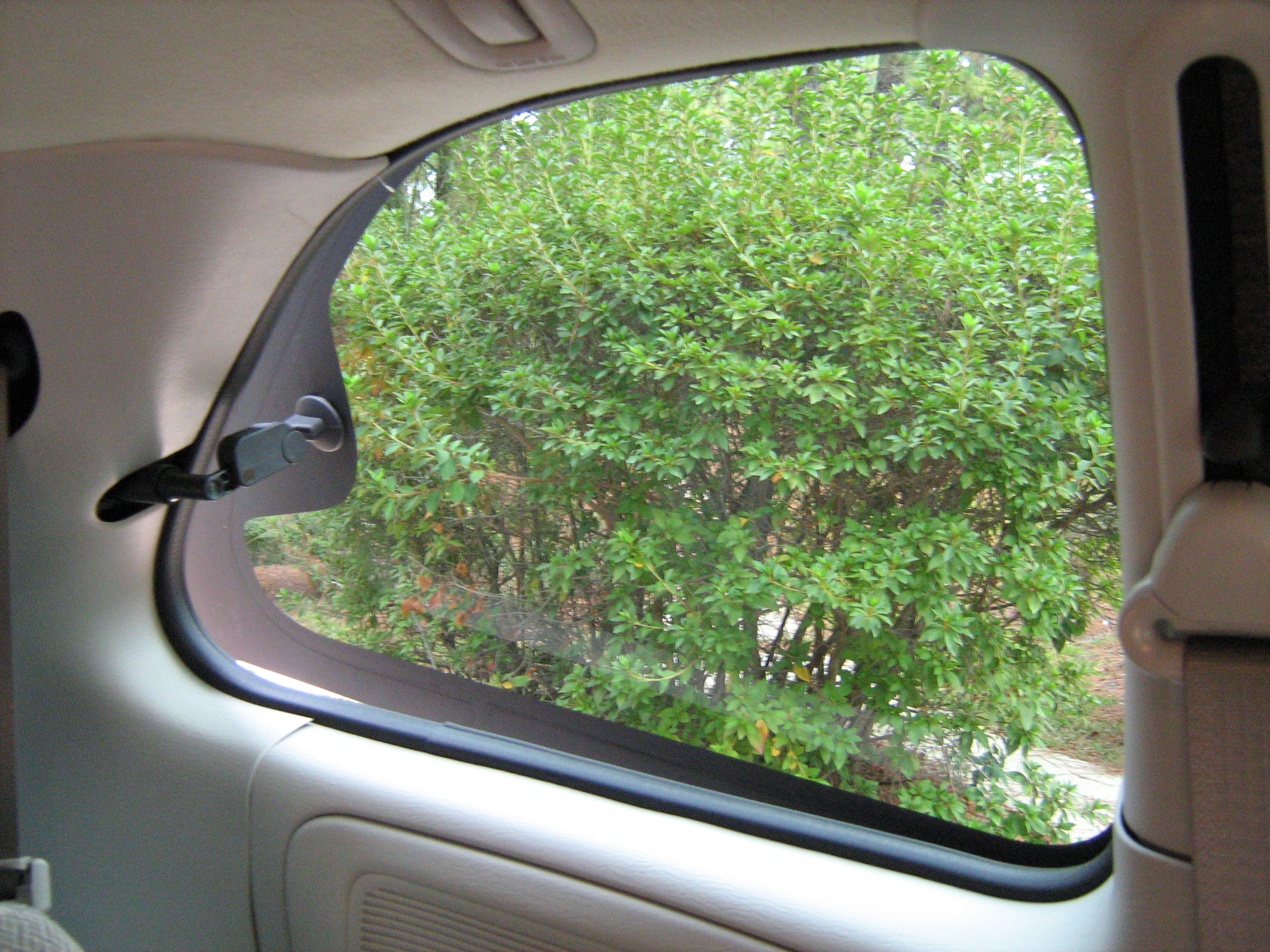
Interior view of a venting quarter glass in the rear of an American minivan between the C- and D-pillars

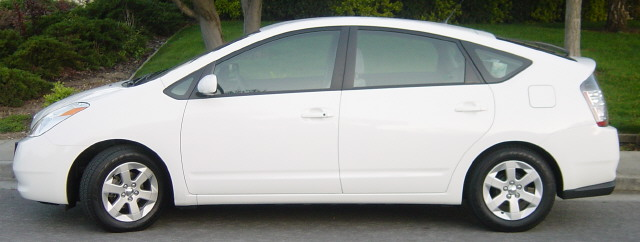
The Toyota Prius has both front and back non-venting quarter glass

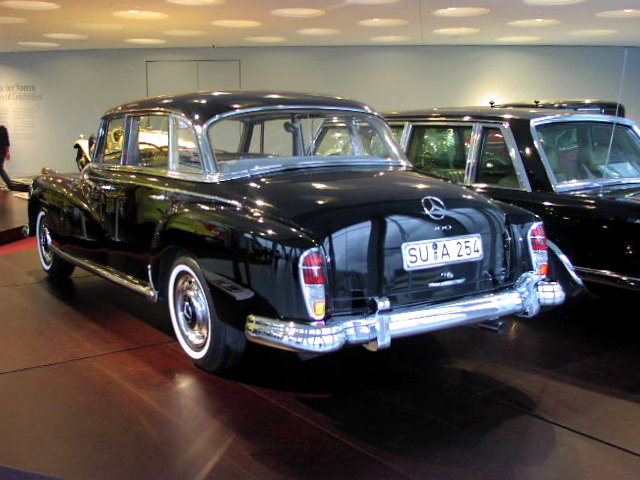
The Mercedes-Benz 300d is a rare example of a vehicle with a fully removable rear quarter window. Called a "parade limousine", removal of its final triangular pane created an unbroken expanse to the rear of the car, allowing crowds to see dignitaries seated in the back.

== See also ==
- Opera window
