= John J. Riccardo =

American businessman (1924–2016)

- Born: John Joseph Riccardo; July 2, 1924; Little Falls, New York, U.S.
- Died: February 13, 2016 (aged 91); Ann Arbor, Michigan, U.S.
- Other name: The Flame Thrower
- Education: University of Michigan
- Occupation: Former Chrysler chairman and CEO
- Years active: 1950–1979
- Spouse: Thelma Fife (m. 1949)
- Children: 5

John Joseph Riccardo (July 2, 1924 – February 13, 2016) was an American automobile executive who was president, chairman, and chief executive of the Chrysler Corporation.

== Early life ==
Riccardo was born on July 2, 1924, in Little Falls, New York. During World War II, he served in the China Burma India Theater as a Corporal in the United States Army Quartermaster Corps. After the war, Riccardo enrolled in the University of Michigan, where he his a bachelor's (1949) and master's (1950) degrees in economics. In 1949, Riccardo married Thelma Fife, daughter of Detroit Lions president D. Lyle Fife. They had five children.

== Career ==
Riccardo worked as an accountant at Touche, Ross, Bailey, & Smart until 1959, when he joined another of the firm's former accountants, Lynn A. Townsend, at the Chrysler Corporation, as a financial officer. He moved quickly through the ranks, becoming a vice president of Chrysler Canada in 1961, sales manager of the Dodge division in 1966, assistant general manager of Dodge in 1964, assistant general manager of Chrysler–Pontiac in 1965, and group vice president for domestic automotive operations later that same year. In 1967, he was elected to the company's board of directors.

In 1970, Virgil Boyd was ousted as president (receiving the new title of vice-chairman) amid lagging sales and earnings, in favor of Riccardo. In this role, Riccardo was "in charge of all corporate operations" and was the number two officer in the company behind chairman and CEO Lynn Townsend.

On July 8, 1975, Chrysler announced that Riccardo would succeed the retiring Townsend effective October 1. Riccardo took over a company that was struggling due to the 1973 oil crisis and 1973–1975 recession. Under his leadership the company disposed of a number of its unprofitable subsidiaries, including Chrysler Europe, Airtemp, and Big Sky Resort. It also sold its unfinished Westmoreland Assembly to Volkswagen. He reduced the size of Chrysler's car inventory, which had left the manufacturer with $200 million in unsold vehicles during the recession. In 1978, Chrysler brought on recently dismissed Ford president Lee Iacocca to help turn around the struggling auto maker. In 1979, Chrysler sought assistance from the federal government. On September 17, 1979, Riccardo announced his resignation – citing poor health and his belief that the company would be more likely to receive government aid under new management. His retirement took effect three days later and he was succeeded by Iacocca. Following Riccardo's departure, Chrysler received $1.5 billion in federal loans, which it paid off seven years early.

== Later life ==
Riccardo resided in Birmingham, Michigan until his death on February 13, 2016. He was survived by his wife and five children.

Business positions
Preceded by Virgil Boyd	President of the Chrysler Corporation; January 8, 1970–November 2, 1978	Succeeded by Lee Iacocca
Preceded by Lynn A. Townsend	Chairman and CEO of the Chrysler Corporation; October 1, 1975–September 20, 1979	Succeeded by Lee Iacocca
