= Michigan Avenue =

Michigan Avenue may refer to:

- Michigan Avenue (Chicago)
- Michigan Avenue (Michigan), a designation for much of both current and former U.S. Route 12 in Michigan
  - Michigan station (Detroit), a station on the Detroit People Mover serving the eponymous street
- Michigan Avenue (Lansing, Michigan), a street through the State Capitol area, a portion of which is M-143
