= Michigan City =

Michigan City may refer to:

- Michigan City, California
- Michigan City, Indiana, the most populous place with this name
- Michigan City, Mississippi
- Michigan City, North Dakota
- Michigan City station (disambiguation), stations of the name
- Rawsonville, Michigan, community platted as Michigan City, now a ghost town under a lake

== See also ==
- Michigan Center, Michigan
