= Lynn A. Townsend =

American automotive executive (1919–2000)

- Born: Lynn Alfred Townsend; May 12, 1919; Flint, Michigan, U.S.
- Died: August 17, 2000 (aged 81); Farmington Hills, Michigan, U.S.
- Education: University of Michigan
- Occupation: Former Chrysler chairman and president
- Years active: 1941–1975
- Spouse: Ruth M. Laing (m. 1940)
- Children: 3

Lynn Alfred Townsend (May 12, 1919 – August 17, 2000) was an American automobile executive widely known for serving as president, chairman, and chief executive of the Chrysler Corporation.

== Early life ==
Townsend was born to Lynn A. and Georgia E. (Crandall) Townsend on May 12, 1919, in Flint, Michigan. The family moved to Beverly Hills, California in hopes the climate would improve his mother's asthma. Georgia Townsend died in 1929 and Lynn Sr. died five years later. Townsend moved to Evansville, Indiana to live with an uncle, North I. Townsend, who was a comptroller. Townsend graduated from high school two years ahead of his class and worked as a teller at the National City Bank for a year after graduating to pay for college. He earned a Bachelor of Arts degree from the University of Michigan in 1940 and a master's in business administration from the same school the following year. On September 14, 1940, Townsend married Ruth M. Laing. They had three sons.

== Career ==
While in college, Townsend worked part time for the accounting firm Briggs & Icerman. From 1941 to 1944, Townsend worked for the accounting firm of Ernst & Ernst. He then served in the United States Navy, where he was the disbursing officer on the USS Hornet. Townsend returned to Ernst & Ernst in 1946, but left after a year to join George Bailey & Company (later known as Touche, Niven, Bailey & Smart and since merged into Deloitte), as a supervising accountant. In 1948, he began working on Chrysler's account. He also did accounting for the American Motors Corporation. In 1952, he became a partner of the firm.

In 1957, Townsend joined Chrysler as comptroller. In 1959, he became group vice president of international relations and joined the company's board of directors. In 1960, Townsend was promoted to vice president of administration – the number two position in the company. On July 27, 1961, Chrysler chairman and president Lester Lum Colbert resigned amid a conflict of interest scandal. He was succeeded as chairman by George H. Love and as president by Townsend. Love, who worked part-time due to his duties with Consolidation Coal, was the company's chief policy officer and Townsend served as the company's chief administrative officer.

Under Townsend's leadership, Chrysler decreased expenses, overhauled its dealer system, and made improvements to its vehicles. Its U.S. market share grew from 7.3% in 1962 to 16.7% in 1966. Love stepped down as chairman in 1966 and Townsend succeeded him while remaining the company's chief executive. Virgil Boyd, Chrysler's group vice president, was promoted to president.

The bankruptcy of Penn Central in 1970 led to a run on Chrysler Financial's commercial paper. The company was bailed out by Manufacturers Hanover Corporation, who arranged for $410 million in loan credits. However, the 1973 oil crisis and 1973–1975 recession caused car sales to plummet, which compounded Chrysler's financial woes. In the fourth quarter of 1974, Chrysler Corporation posted a record loss of $170 million and Moody's Investors Service had removed its rating from Chrysler Financial's commercial paper. On July 4, 1975, Townsend announced he would retire on October 1, 1975.

== Death ==
Townsend died on August 17, 2000, in Farmington Hills, Michigan.

Business positions
Preceded by Lester Lum Colbert	President of the Chrysler Corporation; January 27, 1961–December 1, 1966	Succeeded by Virgil Boyd
Preceded by George H. Love	Chairman of the Chrysler Corporation; December 1, 1966–October 1, 1975	Succeeded by John J. Riccardo
