= Mid-size car =

Vehicle size class

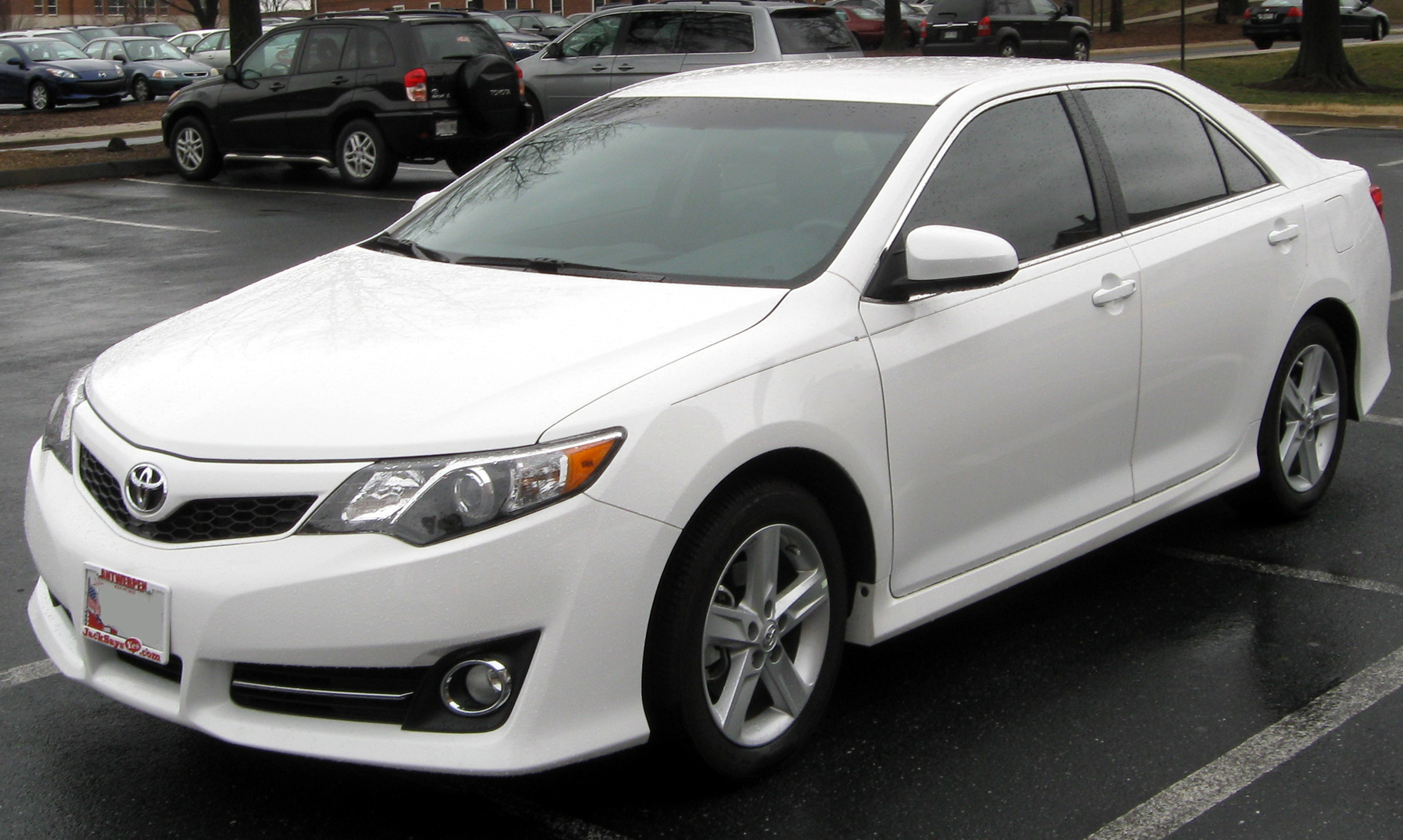
The mid-sized 2012 Toyota Camry

Mid-size, also known as intermediate, is a vehicle size class which originated in the United States and is used for cars larger than compact cars and smaller than full-size cars. "Large family car" is a UK term and a part of the D-segment in the European car classification. Mid-size cars are manufactured in a variety of body styles, including sedans, coupes, station wagons, hatchbacks, and convertibles. Compact executive cars can also fall under the mid-size category.

== History ==
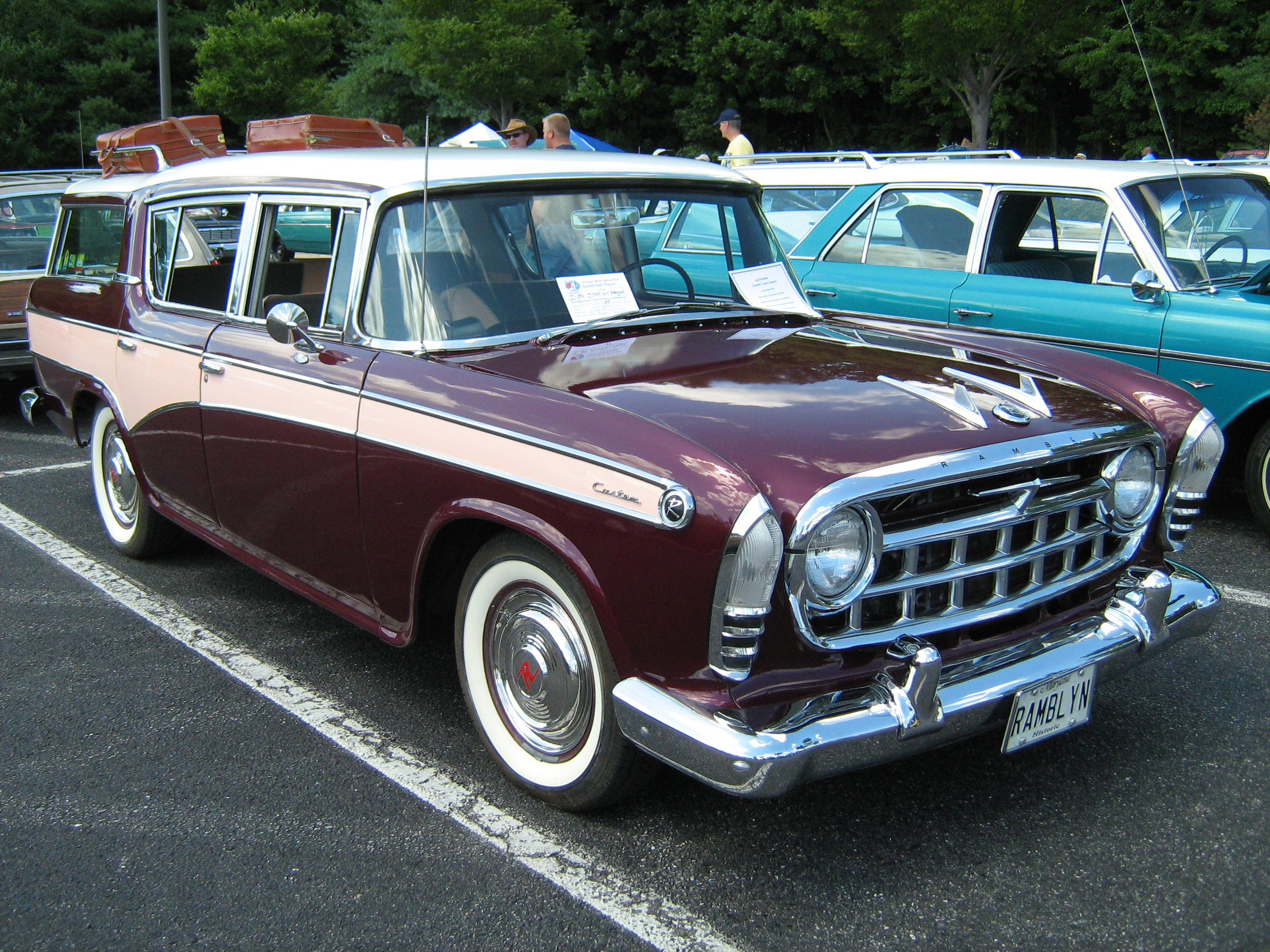
Rambler Six "compact" car later reclassified as an "intermediate"

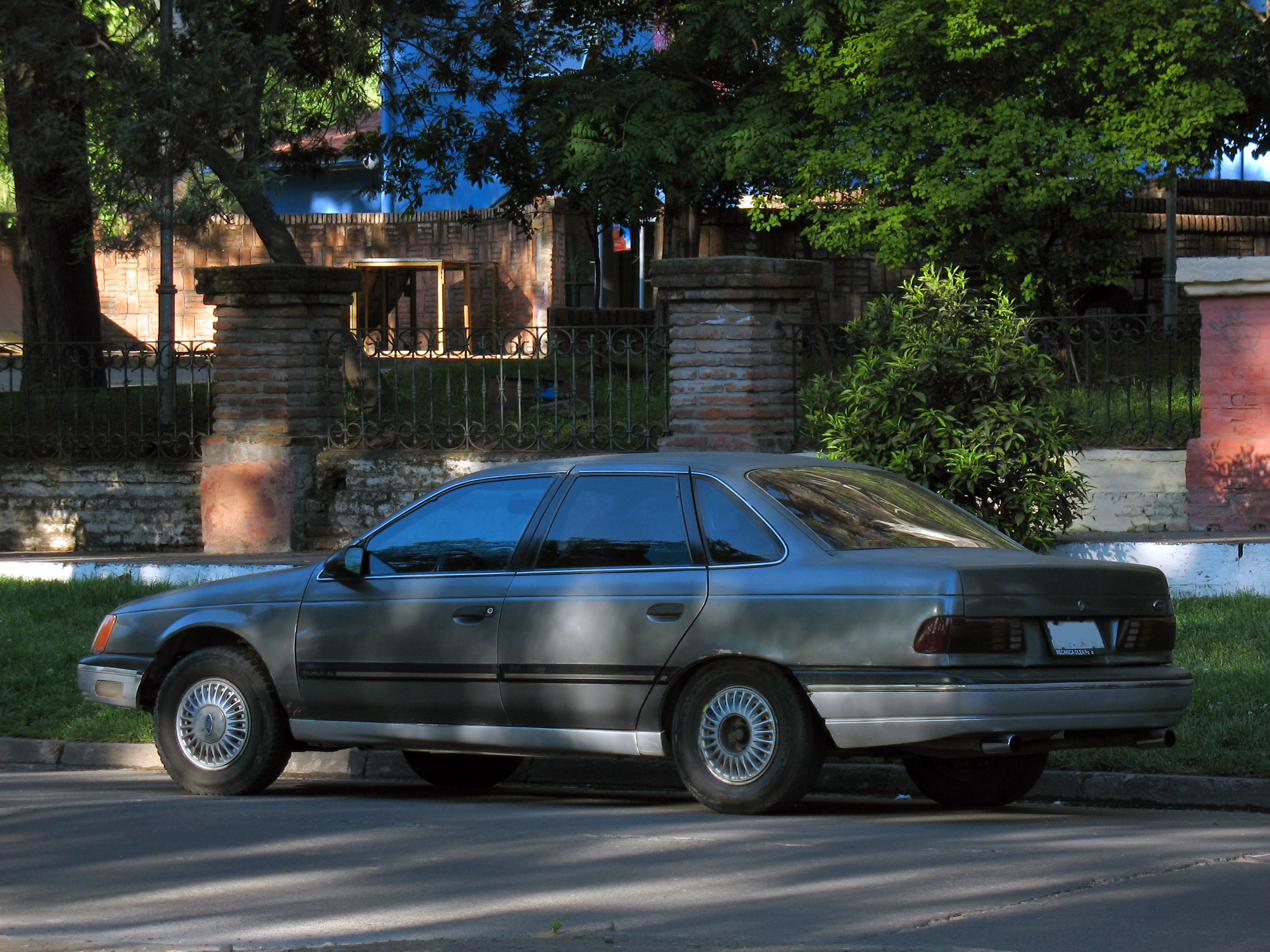
1986–1989 Ford Taurus

The automobile that defined this size in the United States was the Rambler Six that was introduced in 1956, although it was called a "compact" car at that time. Much smaller than any standard contemporary full-size cars, it was called a compact to distinguish it from the small imported cars that were being introduced into the marketplace.

By the early 1960s, the car was renamed the Rambler Classic and while it retained its basic dimensions, it was now competing with an array of new "intermediate" models from General Motors, Ford, and Chrysler. The introduction of the 1962 Ford Fairlane was viewed by consumers as too close to the compact Falcon in size and performance as well as too close to the full-sized Ford models in price. It was the introduction of General Motors "senior compacts" that grew the mid-size market segment as the line of cars themselves kept increasing in size. By 1965, these GM "A platform" mid-size models matched the size of 1955 full-size cars.

During the 1970s, the intermediate class in the U.S. was generally defined as vehicles with wheelbases between 112 inches (2,845 mm) and 118 inches (2,997 mm). Once again, the cars grew and by 1974 they were "about as large as the full-size cars of a decade or so ago ... best sellers include Ford Torino, Chevrolet Chevelle, AMC Matador, Plymouth Satellite ..." The domestic manufacturers began changing the definition of "medium" as they developed new models for an evolving market place.

A turning point occurred in the late 1970s, when rising fuel costs and government fuel economy regulations caused all car classes to shrink, and in many cases to blur. Automakers moved previously "full-size" nameplates to smaller platforms such as the Ford LTD II and the Plymouth Fury. A comparison test by Popular Science of four intermediate sedans (the 1976 AMC Matador, Chevrolet Malibu, Ford Torino, and Dodge Coronet) predicted that these will be the "big cars of the future." By 1978, General Motors made its intermediate models smaller.

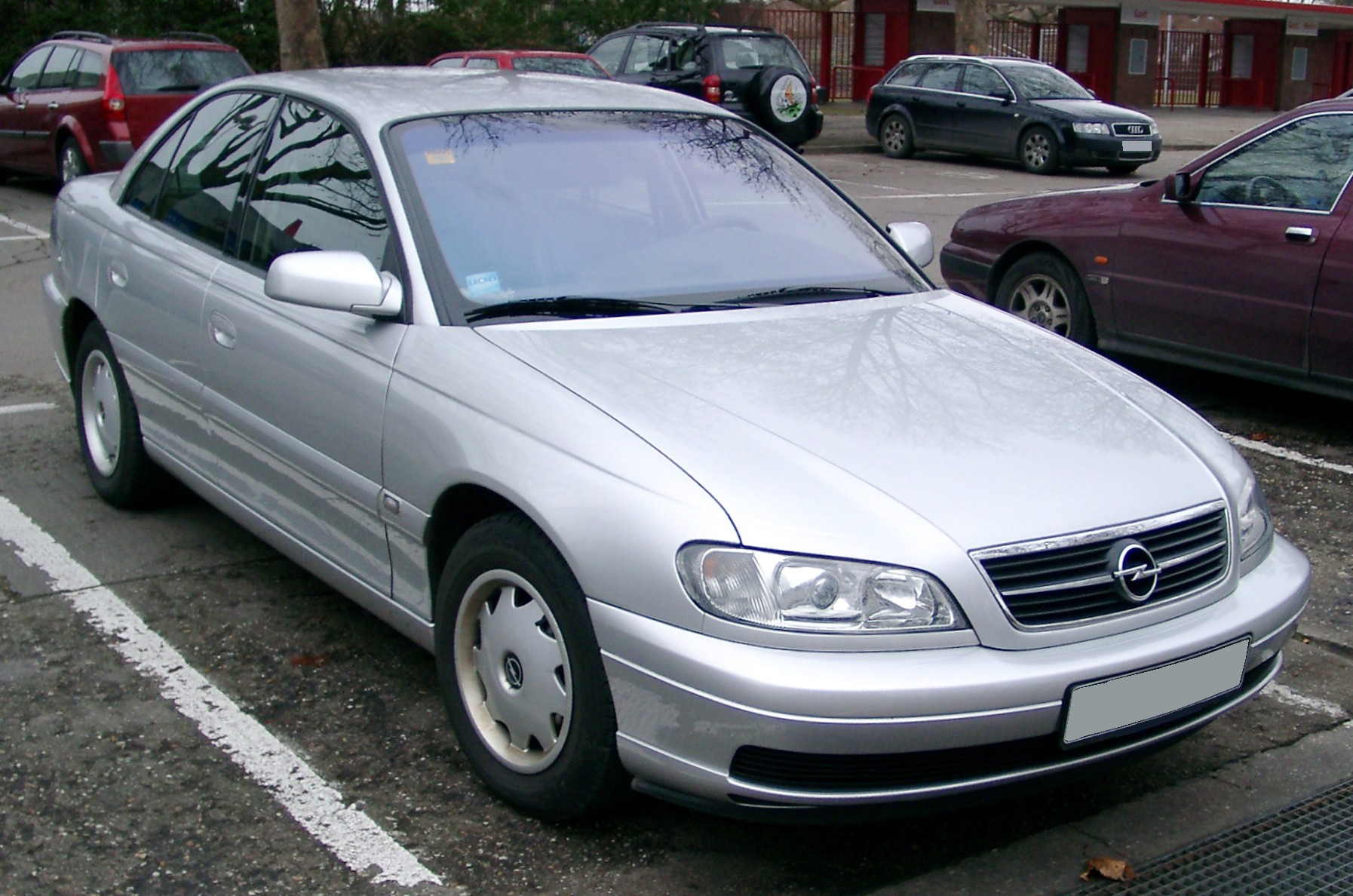
1994–1999 Vauxhall/Opel Omega: a British/European executive car, marketed in the U.S. as a mid-size car (Cadillac Catera)

New "official" size designations in the U.S. were introduced by the EPA, which defined market segments by passenger and cargo space. Formerly mid-sized cars that were built on the same platform, like the AMC Matador sedan, had a combined passenger and cargo volume of 130 cubic feet (3.68 m^{3}), and were now considered "full-size" automobiles.

Cars that defined the mid-size market in the 1980s and 1990s included the Chrysler K-Cars (Dodge Aries and Plymouth Reliant), the Ford Taurus, and the Toyota Camry, which was upsized into the midsize class in 1991. The Taurus and Camry came to define the mid-size market for decades.

Mid-size cars were the most popular category of cars sold in the United States, with 27.4 percent during the first half of 2012, ahead of crossovers at 19 percent.

== Current definition ==
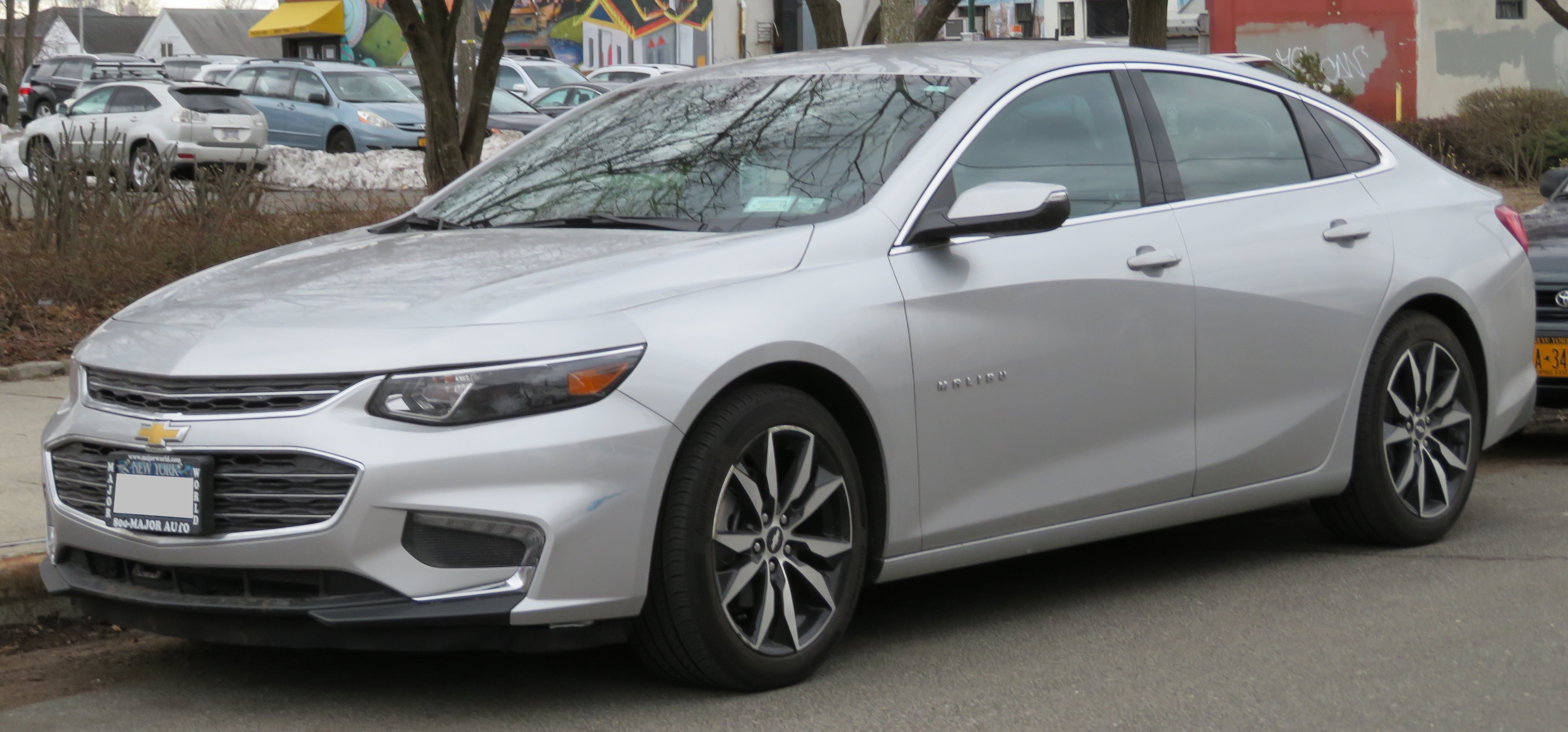
Chevrolet Malibu

The United States Environmental Protection Agency (EPA) Fuel Economy Regulations for 1977 and Later Model Year (dated July 1996) includes definitions for classes of automobiles. Based on the combined passenger and cargo volume, mid-size cars are defined as having an interior volume index of 110–119 cu ft (3.1–3.4 m^{3}).

== See also ==
- Car classification
- Vehicle size class
