= Michigan Township =

Michigan Township may refer to:

== Indiana ==
- Michigan Township, Clinton County, Indiana
- Michigan Township, LaPorte County, Indiana

== Kansas ==
- Michigan Township, Scott County, Kansas, in Scott County, Kansas

== Nebraska ==
- Michigan Township, Valley County, Nebraska

== North Dakota ==
- Michigan Township, Grand Forks County, North Dakota, in Grand Forks County, North Dakota
- Michigan Township, Nelson County, North Dakota, in Nelson County, North Dakota

== See also ==
- List of cities, villages, and townships in Michigan
