= List of low-code development platforms =

Below is a list of notable low-code development platforms.

== Implementations ==
- AppSheet is a no-code application from Google used to create applications for mobile and web.
- Acceleo is an open-source code generator for Eclipse that generates textual language (Java, PHP, Python, etc.) from EMF models (UML, SysML, etc.).
- Actifsource is a plugin for Eclipse that allows graphical modelling and model-based code generation using custom templates.
- Appian is an enterprise low-code automation platform for mobile application development. The platform includes a visual interface and pre-built development modules.
- Betty Blocks is a low-code platform for building custom applications like web portals, business solutions, and digital experiences.
- Bubble is a no-code application development platform for building and deploying web and mobile applications through a visual development environment, with tools for designing interfaces, data, workflows, and application logic.
- Caspio is a low-code application development platform for creating online databases and web applications.
- DMS Software Reengineering Toolkit is a system for defining domain-specific languages and translating them to other languages.
- Claris FileMaker is a low-code development platform for mobile, cloud and on-premise environments.
- GeneXus is a cross-platform, knowledge representation-based development tool that generates native code for enterprise-class applications for web applications, smart devices, and Microsoft Windows.
- Kissflow is a low-code platform for workflow automation and application development.
- Magic Software is a low-code platform for building and deploying business applications across desktop, web, and mobile using a metadata-driven, visual development environment.
- The Maple computer algebra system includes code generators for Fortran, MATLAB, C, and Java. Wolfram Language (Mathematica), and MuPAD have comparable interfaces.
- Mendix is a low-code platform for building web and mobile applications using visual drag-and-drop elements.
- Microsoft Power Automate (previously known as Microsoft Flow) is a low-code platform used for creating tailored end-to-end process automation.
- m-Power is a low-code development platform for building enterprise web applications, reports, and workflow automations over existing databases.
- OSBP is a software factory provided as open source by the Eclipse Foundation. It combines no-code/low-code elements with classic software development. Coding is largely replaced by a descriptive modeling of the desired software, while allowing developers to integrate their own source code. The applications are intended for professional use in companies.
- Oracle APEX is a low-code enterprise AI application platform environment proprietary to Oracle.
- OutSystems is a low-code platform for omnichannel enterprise application development.
- Salesforce is a low-code platform for enterprise application development, especially CRM and ERP.
- Spring Roo is an open source active code generator for Spring Framework based Java applications. It uses AspectJ mixins to provide separation of concerns during round-trip maintenance.
- Trackvia is a low-code platform first released in 2007.
- UiPath is a low-code/no-code development platform for enterprise automation and robotic process automation (RPA).
- Uniface is a provider of model-driven, low code application development software for developers, enterprises and ISV's.
- WaveMaker is an enterprise low-code platform mainly oriented towards core application development and delivery users. The applications created are largely open-standards-based and the tool can be used to generate code in the background by drag and drop visual development.
- Wix Studio is a low-code web development platform by Wix. It supports website creation through visual editing and custom code, with features for third-party integration and design customization.
- Zoho Creator is a low-code application development platform from Zoho Corporation, used for building custom web and mobile applications.

== See also ==
- Compiler optimization
- Declarative programming
- Graphical user interface
- Integrated development environment (IDE)
- Refactor
- Robotic Process Automation (RPA)
- Snippet management
- User interface markup language
- wizard (software)
