= List of online database creator apps =

This list of online database creator apps lists notable web apps where end users with minimal database administration expertise can create online databases to share with team members.

Users need not have the coding skills to manage the solution stack themselves, because the web app already provides this predefined functionality. Such online database creator apps serve the gap between IT professionals (who can manage such a stack themselves) and people who would not create databases at all anyway. In other words, they provide a low-code way of doing database administration. As the concept of low-code development in general continues to evolve, some of the brands that began as online database creator apps are evolving into low-code development platforms for both the databases and the custom apps that use them.

- Airtable
- Bubble
- Caspio
- Coda.io
- Microsoft Access web apps plus SharePoint
- Oracle Application Express a.k.a. APEX
- Quickbase
- WaveMaker Rapid
- ZohoCreator
