= Artech =

Artech may refer to:

- Arcadia Charter School, a charter school in Northfield, Minnesota, United States
- ARTech Consultores SRL, a Uruguayan software company, creators of GeneXus, Deklarit and Gxportal
- Artech Digital Entertainment, video game developer
- Artech House, a publisher of scientific books
- Artech, an American IT employment company
