= No code =

No code may refer to:

- No Code, a 1996 album by Pearl Jam
- No Code (company), a British video game company
- No-code development platform, software development platforms, build software with no code writing
  - Low-code development platforms, software development platforms based on graphical user interfaces
- Do not resuscitate, or "no code", a legal order indicating that someone doesn't want CPR
