= EMMS =

EMMS may refer to:

- Emms, a surname (including a list of people with the name)
- EMMS International, originally the Edinburgh Medical Missionary Society
- European Military Medical Services, a publication

== See also ==
- EMM (disambiguation)
