= Emmanuel Straschnov =

French entrepreneur and co-founder of Bubble

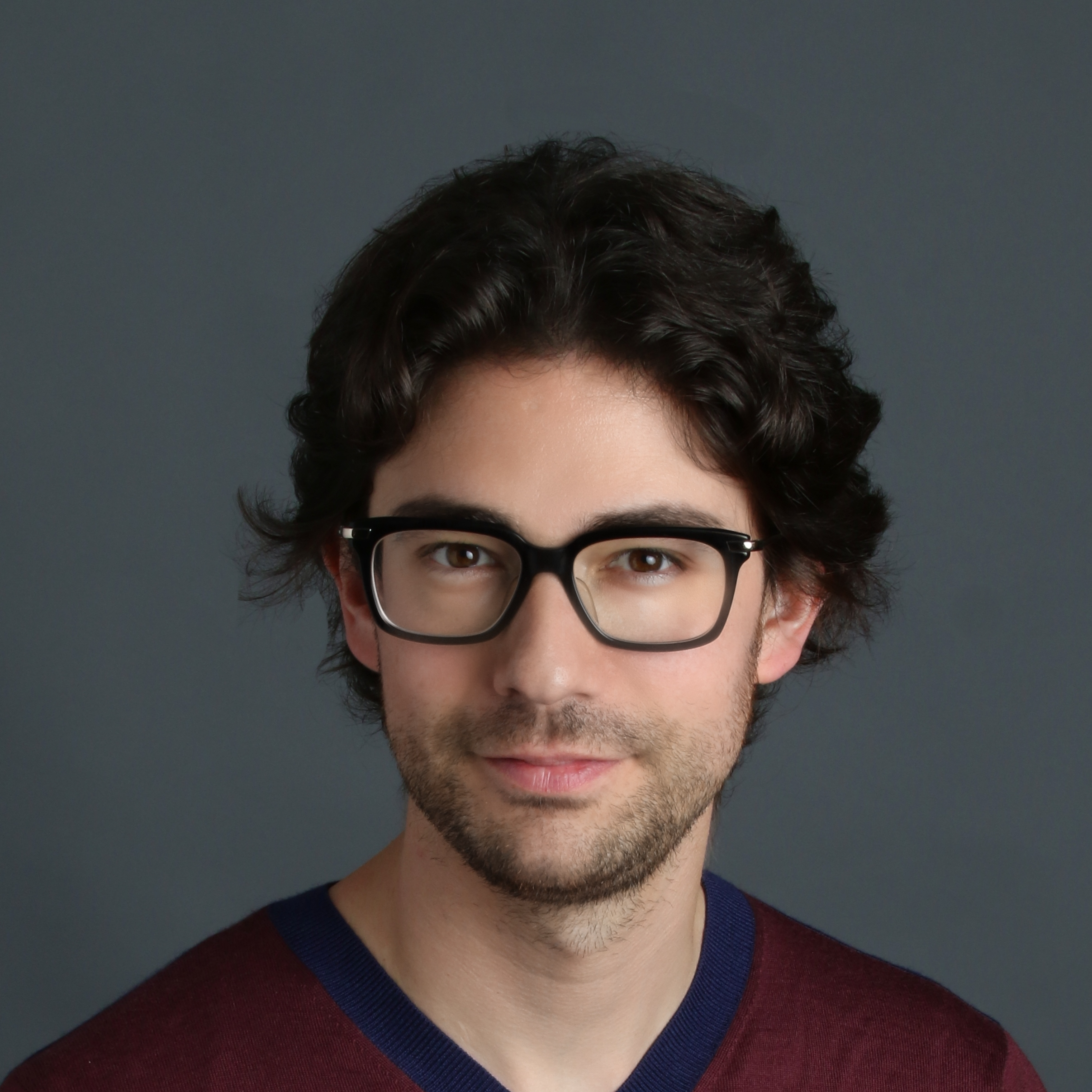
- Born: Paris, France
- Education: Lycée Louis-le-Grand; École polytechnique École nationale des ponts et chaussées Harvard Business School
- Occupation: Internet entrepreneur
- Known for: Co-founding Bubble

Emmanuel Straschnov is a French entrepreneur and the co-founder of Bubble, a visual programming platform. He is considered one of the early pioneers in the no-code movement.

== Early life and education ==
Straschnov grew up in Normandy. He attended preparatory classes at Lycée Louis-le-Grand. In 2003, he was admitted to the École polytechnique, graduating in 2006.

He joined the French public sector through the Corps des ponts et chaussées, and later worked in strategy consulting in China. In 2012, he received his Master of Business Administration from Harvard Business School.

== Career ==
After graduating from École Polytechnique, Straschnov began his career in strategy consulting at Roland Berger in Shanghai.

In 2012, after completing his MBA, he met Josh Haas and joined him as a co-founder of Bubble, a visual programming tool designed to make app development accessible without traditional coding.

In 2019, Bubble raised $6.25 million in funding from Silicon Valley investors and entrepreneurs.

Straschnov regularly speaks on topics related to Bubble, the no-code movement, and the importance of making technology more accessible.

== See also ==
- Bubble (programming language)
- No-code development platform
