= Information schema =

Standard for accessing information about a database schema

In relational databases, the information schema (information_schema) is an ANSI-standard set of read-only views that provide information about all of the tables, views, columns, and procedures in a database. It can be used as a source of the information that some databases make available through non-standard commands, such as:

- the SHOW command of MySQL
- the DESCRIBE command of Oracle's SQL*Plus
- the \d command in psql (PostgreSQL's default command-line program).

 => SELECT count(table_name) FROM information_schema.tables;
  count 
 -------
     99
 (1 row)
 => SELECT column_name, data_type, column_default, is_nullable
       FROM information_schema.columns WHERE table_name='alpha';
  column_name | data_type | column_default | is_nullable 
 -------------+-----------+----------------+-------------
  foo         | integer   |                | YES
  bar         | character |                | YES
 (2 rows)
 => SELECT * FROM information_schema.information_schema_catalog_name;
  catalog_name 
 --------------
  johnd
 (1 row)

== Implementation ==
As a notable exception among major database systems, Oracle does not as of 2015 implement the information schema. An open-source project exists to address this.

RDBMSs that support information_schema include:

- Amazon Redshift
- Apache Hive
- Microsoft SQL Server
- MonetDB
- Snowflake
- MySQL
- PostgreSQL
- H2 Database
- HSQLDB
- InterSystems Caché
- MariaDB
- SingleStore (formerly MemSQL)
- Mimer SQL
- Trino
- Presto
- CrateDB
- ClickHouse
- CockroachDB
- Kinetica DB
- TiDB

RDBMSs that do not support information_schema include:

- Apache Derby
- Apache Ignite
- Firebird
- Microsoft Access
- IBM Informix
- Ingres
- IBM Db2
- Oracle Database
- SAP HANA
- SQLite
- Sybase ASE
- Sybase SQL Anywhere
- Teradata
- Vertica

== See also ==
- Oracle metadata
