= EMM =

EMM may refer to:

== People ==
- EMM (musical artist), Emma "EMM" Norris, American musical artist
- Colin Emm (1932–2012), birth name of Richard Dawson, British-American comedian and actor
- Emm Gryner (born 1975), Canadian singer-songwriter

== Other uses ==
- EMM (psychedelic), a drug
- Eastern Mennonite Missions, an American Christian mission agency
- Electronic Music Midwest, an American music festival
- Emm Brook, a river in Berkshire, England
- Enterprise mobility management
- Kemmerer Municipal Airport, in Wyoming, United States
- Mamulique language
- Oracle Enterprise Metadata Manager
- Emirates Mars Mission also called Hope or Al-Amal, an UAE robotic mission to Mars
- EMm, Eesti Maanteemuuseum (Estonian Road Museum)
