= GeneXus =

Computer programming tool

- Developer: GeneXus
- Initial release: 1988; 38 years ago
- Stable release: GeneXus 17
- Preview release: Non [±]
- Written in: Prolog
- Operating system: Microsoft Windows
- Available in: English, Japanese, Spanish, Chinese
- Type: Application framework, Rapid Application Development, Knowledge-based development tool, Low Code
- License: Proprietary
- Website: www.genexus.com

GeneXus is a low code, cross-platform, knowledge representation-based development tool, mainly oriented towards enterprise-class applications for web applications, smart devices, and the Microsoft Windows platform.

GeneXus uses mostly declarative language to generate native code for multiple environments. It includes a normalization module, which creates and maintains an optimal database structure based on user views. The languages for which code can be generated include COBOL, Java, Objective-C, RPG, Ruby, Visual Basic, and Visual FoxPro. Some of the DBMSs supported are Microsoft SQL Server, Oracle, IBM Db2, Informix, PostgreSQL, and MySQL.

GeneXus was developed by Uruguayan company ARTech Consultores SRL which later renamed to Genexus SA. The latest version is GeneXus 18, which was released on November 10, 2022.

== See also ==
- Comparison of code generation tools
- List of low-code development platforms
