= Emms =

Emms is a surname.

Notable people with the name include:

- Carl Emms (born 1966), British radio presenter and disc jockey
- David Emms (1925–2015), English educationalist and rugby player
- Gail Emms (born 1977), English badminton player
- Hap Emms (1905–1988), Canadian ice hockey player and coach
- John Emms (disambiguation), several people
- Mitchel Emms, British contestant on The Voice UK in 2013
- Robert Emms (born 1986), English actor
- William Emms (1930–1993), Australian school teacher and screenwriter
- Winifred Emms (1883–1972), English entertainer

== See also ==
- EMMS (disambiguation)
