= SYPO =

Stichting SYPO is a Dutch NGO established in 2003, with the objective to 'offer structural aid in Uganda by initiating and supporting projects with a sustainable, entrepreneurial character'. SYPO focuses on microfinance and SME financing in rural areas. The NGO has confined its operations to the former Mukono District. SYPO works with around fifteen volunteers in the Netherlands, and works with paid employees and partner projects Uganda. The core focus of SYPO is microfinance, through its Ugandan subsidiary SYPO Uganda Ltd. The main achievement of SYPO has been to develop a business model to reach women in very remote areas with low-cost business loans, relying on "lean" principles, mobile money and online technology systems. SYPO's Director is Duko Hopman, supervised by a board which is chaired by Ger van der Bruggen.

== History ==
SYPO was started in 2003 to help partner organisation Pat the Child initiate the 'Yoghurt Project'. In this project, pregnant Friesian cows were donated to local women who were willing but financially unable to adopt local orphans. In the same project SYPO enabled Pat the Child to start a yoghurt factory which created a local market for the cows' milk and revenues for the NGO Pat the Child. The yoghurt is sold under the name Life Dairy throughout the Mukono District. After completion of this first project in 2007, SYPO decided to continue its operations, starting new projects aimed at entrepreneurship and economic development.

== Projects ==
After the Yoghurt Project (see above), SYPO started a grassroot medical project called 'MediStructures', and a microfinance project through its subsidiary SYPO Uganda Ltd. SYPO microdevelopment provides business loans to thousands of solidarity lending groups of women in rural areas of Mukono District. The project employs loan officers to visit the clients for weekly repayments, through a network of flexible, low-cost field offices. All SYPO's projects were initiated in cooperation with local partner organisations, in charge of the daily management of the projects. In 2009, SYPO started the hotel Besaniya in Mukono town as an income generating project. This hotel, aimed at European volunteers working in Mukono town, was sold to the Dutch NGO ICUganda in August 2010. SYPO focuses mainly on its microfinance project, and will continue to guide and control this project in the coming years.

== Microbanker.com ==
In 2009, SYPO started the development of an Oracle Application Express database named SYMBA, to serve as an online client administration system for its microfinance project. SYMBA includes client profiles, credit history and a transaction database. In 2010, SYPO decided to use SYMBA to offer individual business plans for sponsors around the world on a website to be named 'SYPO microbanking', modeled after the Kiva peer to peer lending scheme. SYPO microbanking offers the possibility of limited contact between funder and borrower through updates and six-monthly questions. SYPO has plans to use both the database SYMBA and SYPO microbanking technology to help other starting microfinance institutions in the future.

== Organisation ==
SYPO is a Dutch NGO registered in the Dutch chamber of commerce, and recognised by the Dutch Tax Administration as an algemeen nut beogende instelling, exempting donations to SYPO from taxation. The NGO is operated by approximately fifteen volunteers in the Netherlands, organised in work groups aimed at fundraising and individual project support. SYPO has a Director in an executive role, supervised by a Board. The NGO has links with several partner organisations in Uganda, and directly supports employment of approximately fifteen Ugandans. SYPO has offices in Mukono town. SYPO is funded by individual sponsors (12%), larger NGO's (42%) and Dutch businesses (46%).
