= Oracle metadata =

Database

Oracle Database provides information about all of the tables, views, columns, and procedures in a database. This information about information is known as metadata. It is stored in two locations: data dictionary tables (accessed via built-in views) and a metadata registry.

Other relational database management systems support an ANSI-standard equivalent called information schema.

== Views for metadata ==
The total number of these views depends on the Oracle version, but is in a 1000 range.

The main built-in views accessing Oracle RDBMS data dictionary tables are few, and are as follows:

- ALL_OBJECTS – list of all objects in the current database that are accessible to the current user;
- ALL_TABLES – list of all tables in the current database that are accessible to the current user;
- ALL_VIEWS – list of all views in the current database that are accessible to the current user;
- ALL_TAB_COLUMNS – list of all columns in the database that are accessible to the current user;
- ALL_ARGUMENTS – lists the arguments of functions and procedures that are accessible to the current user;
- ALL_ERRORS – lists descriptions of errors on all stored objects (views, procedures, functions, packages, and package bodies) that are accessible to the current user;
- ALL_OBJECT_SIZE – included for backward compatibility with Oracle version 5;
- ALL_PROCEDURES – (from Oracle 9 onwards) lists all functions and procedures (along with associated properties) that are accessible to the current user;
- ALL_SOURCE – describes the text (i.e. PL/SQL) source of the stored objects accessible to the current user;
- ALL_TRIGGERS – list all the triggers accessible to the current user.

In addition there are equivalent views prefixed "USER_" which show only the objects owned by the current user (i.e. a more restricted view of metadata) and prefixed "DBA_" which show all objects in the database (i.e. an unrestricted global view of metadata for the database instance). Naturally the access to "DBA_" metadata views requires specific privileges.

=== Example 1: finding tables ===
Find all Tables that have PATTERN in the table name

  SELECT Owner AS Schema_Name, Table_Name
  FROM   All_Tables
  WHERE  Table_Name LIKE '%PATTERN%'
  ORDER  BY Owner, Table_Name;

=== Example 2: finding columns ===
Find all tables that have at least one column that matches a specific PATTERN in the column name

  SELECT Owner AS Schema_Name, Table_Name, Column_Name
  FROM   All_Tab_Columns
  WHERE  Column_Name LIKE '%PATTERN%'
  ORDER  BY 1,2,3;

=== Example 3: counting rows of columns ===
Estimate a total number of rows in all tables containing a column name that matches PATTERN (this is SQL*Plus specific script)

  COLUMN DUMMY NOPRINT
  COMPUTE SUM OF NUM_ROWS ON DUMMY
  BREAK ON DUMMY
  SELECT
   NULL DUMMY,
   T.TABLE_NAME,
   C.COLUMN_NAME,
   T.NUM_ROWS
  FROM
   ALL_TABLES T,
   ALL_TAB_COLUMNS C
  WHERE
   T.TABLE_NAME = C.TABLE_NAME
   AND C.COLUMN_NAME LIKE '%PATTERN%'
   AND T.OWNER = C.OWNER
  ORDER BY T.TABLE_NAME;

Note that NUM_ROWS records the number of rows which were in a table when (and if) it was last analyzed. This will most likely deviate from the actual number of rows currently in the table.

=== Example 4: finding view columns ===
Find view columns

SELECT TABLE_NAME,
    column_name,
    decode(c.DATA_TYPE,
       'VARCHAR2',
       c.DATA_TYPE || '(' || c.DATA_LENGTH || ')',
       'NUMBER',
       DECODE(c.data_precision, 
           NULL, 
           c.DATA_TYPE, 
           0, 
                c.DATA_TYPE, 
           c.DATA_TYPE || '(' || c.data_precision || DECODE(c.data_scale, 
                                   NULL, 
                                   ')', 
                                   0, 
                                   ')' , 
                                   ', ' || c.data_scale || ')')),
       c.DATA_TYPE) data_type
 FROM cols c, obj o
 WHERE c.TABLE_NAME = o.object_name
   AND o.object_type = 'VIEW'   
   AND c.table_name LIKE '%PATTERN%'
   ORDER BY c.table_name, c.column_id;

Warning: This is incomplete with respect to multiple datatypes including char, varchar and timestamp and uses extremely old, deprecated dictionary views, back to oracle 5.

=== Use of underscore in table and column names ===
The underscore is a special SQL pattern match to a single character and should be escaped if you are in fact looking for an underscore character in the LIKE clause of a query.

Just add the following after a LIKE statement:

 ESCAPE '_'

And then each literal underscore should be a double underscore: __

Example

 LIKE '%__G' ESCAPE '_'

== Oracle Metadata Registry ==
The Oracle product Oracle Enterprise Metadata Manager (EMM) is an ISO/IEC 11179 compatible metadata registry. It stores administered metadata in a consistent format that can be used for metadata publishing. In January 2006, EMM was available only through Oracle consulting services.

== See also ==
- Information schema
- Metadata
