= Betty Blocks =

Dutch software-as-a-service provider based in Alkmaar, the Netherlands

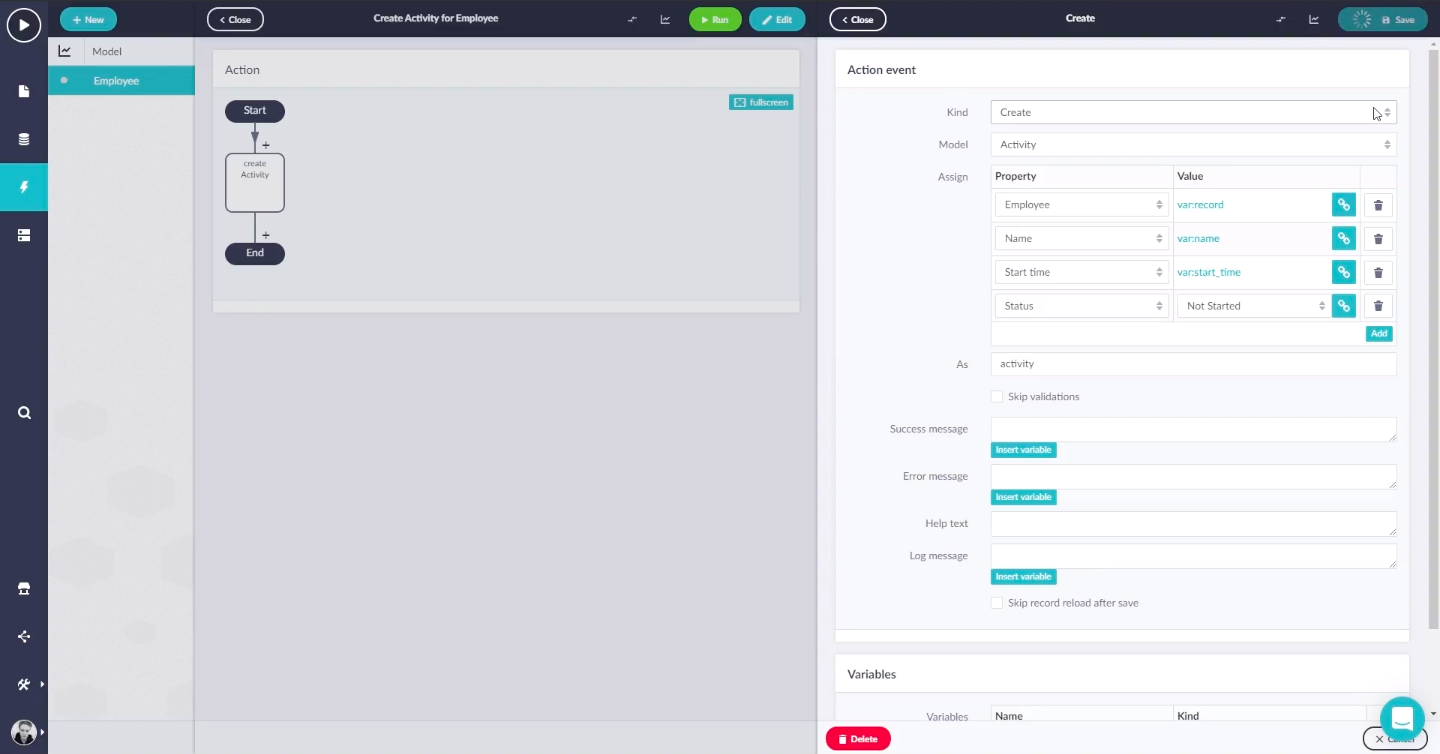
Flowchart interface for the Betty Blocks no-code development platform

Betty Blocks is a Dutch software-as-a-service provider and low-code development platform based in Alkmaar, the Netherlands.

Betty Blocks was founded in 2016. Chris Obdam is the company's co-founder and chief executive officer. Chris Obdam is an advocate for developers collaborating with IT departments through low-code technology.

== History ==
Betty Blocks started out as a no-code development platform, letting people to create web applications. As the platform grew, Betty Blocks shifted towards the low-code development spectrum, letting developers have more control when building these applications.

The company was founded in 2016 by Chris and Tim Obdam.

In 2017, ING Group invested three million euros in the company. In the same year, it was also included Gartner Quadrant list.

In 2017, Betty Blocks was accredited with an ISO 27001 certification.

In 2018, the company partnered with VX.

In 2019, NIBC Bank invested an undisclosed amount in the company.

In August 2021, NIBC Bank along with others, invested 33 million euros for further development of its platform.

In 2024, Betty Blocks hits $9.1M in revenue with a total number of 112 employees.

In 2025, Betty Blocks added AI-assisted software development under the brand name “Betty Genius”, allowing enterprises to integrate vibe coding into their workflows.

In 2025, Betty Blocks launches “Betty Open” and becomes the first low-code platform to support WebAssembly-based components when building web applications.

== Software ==
The software is a cloud-native application development platform that works by visual modeling rather than programming and allows both developers and business users to build their own web, internal, or backend applications without writing any code. Betty Blocks tries to simplify the development of software through use of templates, reusable components, and it's own library of integrations, while also letting programmers add manual code if needed.

Front-end components are based on React, allowing developers to customize them to create React components. WebAssembly-based components enable users to import and export business logic using a programming language of their choice.
