= Scriptcase =

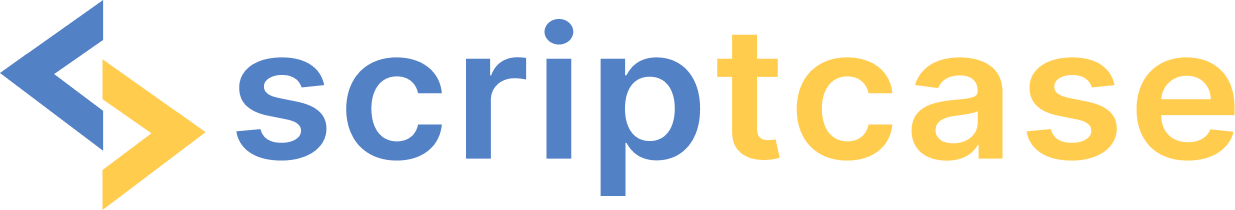
- Developer: NetMake
- Initial release: 2000
- Stable release: 9.12 / February 24, 2025
- Operating system: macOS, Windows, Linux
- Type: PHP code generator
- License: Commercial
- Website: www.scriptcase.net

Scriptcase is a Low-code tool that works as a code generator for systems and web applications in PHP.

The development as well as runtime environment use a webserver like Apache, PHP and an SQL database. In difference to PHP frameworks, after deployment the development software is no longer necessary to run the application.

== Features ==
Scriptcase can be used as a mere CRUD (Create, Read, Update and Delete) tool for given database tables, but also enables custom code to manage business rules and validation. It allows to create forms and queries, ranging from simple forms to a high level of complex elements to manipulate data from databases like MySQL, PostgreSQL, SQLite, Interbase, Firebird, Access, Oracle, MS SQLServer, IBM Db2, SyBase, Informix and ODBC connections.

The software facilitates development with JavaScript and allows to create applications with AJAX through a set of features and services, such as navigation between pages or sections, or automatic validation of fields.

Report output can be exported to MS Word, MS Excel, PDF or printed. Complex SQL statements can be used like sub-selects, joins and stored procedures. Scriptcase allows users to write PHP code to handle exceptions and create more complex validation. It is also possible to create infrastructure such as menus, login screens and a security system with authentication. Tabs in forms allow to group form pages or queries on the same page. The package also includes a documentation generator that can integrate the developer team.

Platform development began in 2000. Since then, it has been receiving regular updates.

The pricing model includes yearly subscriptions as well as lifetime options. Prices start from 400$ per year for the 'starter' version and reach 1.400$ for a lifetime 'enterprise' package or 650$ per developer which supports more database products.
