= John Emms =

John Emms may refer to:

- John Emms (artist) (1844–1912), English painter
- John Emms (chess player) (born 1967), English chess master
- John Victor Emms (1912–1993), English landscape painter
