= GridApp =

GridApp Systems, Inc.
- Type: Private
- Industry: Computer software
- Founded: 2002; 24 years ago
- Headquarters: New York City, New York, United States
- Key people: Rob Gardos, Chairman & CEO, Shamoun Murtza, CTO, Matthew Zito, Chief Scientist, Cathryn Dwyre, VP of Corporate Development, Dan Cohen, Dir. of Development, Eric Gross, Mr. Database
- Products: BMC Bladelogic Database Automation
- Website: www.gridapp.com

GridApp Systems, Inc. was a database automation software company. It was purchased by BMC Software in December 2010.

Founded in 2002 and headquartered in New York City, GridApp Systems was the brainchild of five former employees of Register.com, Rob Gardos, Shamoun Murtza, Matthew Zito, Dan Cohen, and Eric Gross. The five realized that 85% of the routine tasks performed by database administrators could be automated, decreasing critical errors and improving productivity; all five functioned as GridApp's CEO, CTO, Chief Scientist, Director of Development, and Mr. Database respectively.

GridApp's flagship product is GridApp Clarity, which has won the following awards and recognition:

- SearchSQLServer ― 2006 ― "Performance and Tuning" Category ― Silver
- ServerWatch ― 2008 ― "Automation and Compliance" category ― Silver
- CODiE ― 2008 ― "Best Database Management Software" category ― Finalist
- EMA ― 2008 ― "EMA Rising Star"
