= Trackvia =

Low-code workflow platform

- Original authors: Chris Basham; Matt McAdams
- Developers: Trackvia, Inc.
- Release: 2007; 19 years ago
- Operating system: Windows
- Available in: English
- Type: Low-code workflow platform
- Website: trackvia.com

Trackvia is a cloud-based low-code workflow platform developed by Trackvia, Inc. It is based in Denver, Colorado.

== History ==
Trackvia was founded in 2007 by Chris Basham and Matt McAdams. It was founded as a web-based database.

In 2008, the platform added functionality to create dynamic applications.

== Platform ==
Trackvia platform is accessible on a SaaS basis. It provides users a database that can be customized to their needs. It also provides a no-code environment to users who want to create an app based on their requirements.

The applications can also be used to automate processes such as expense reporting, time tracking, project management, and asset management.

Trackvia can be accessed through mobile apps on Android and iOS.

== Reception ==
PCMag's Rob Marvin called it "a simply designed and easy-to-use low-code development platform".
