= AnyChart =

JavaScript library

AnyChart is a proprietary JavaScript library for cross-platform data visualization in the form of interactive charts and dashboards. It was initially available as a Flash chart component and integrated as such by Oracle in APEX.

== History ==
AnyChart was first developed in 2003 as a Flash chart component to visualize XML data.

In 2007, Oracle licensed AnyChart to implement Flash charting in Oracle Application Express (APEX) used by 100,000 developers monthly as of March 2007.

With the APEX 4.2 release in 2012, AnyChart 6 was introduced with the support of HTML5 charts based on SVG rendering in addition to Flash charts. Version 7.x of AnyChart was already completely based on JavaScript and HTML5.

AnyChart 8.x first released in 2017 has a modular system and supports more than 90 chart types, including variations of basic charts, Gantt charts, meteorological and environmental data graphs (such as air temperature and precipitation, depth measures), and maps, along with custom drawing and diverse options to work with data. In 2019, it also became available as visualization extensions for Qlik Sense.

== License ==
AnyChart is free for non-profit use and requires a paid license for use in commercial software. Its source code is open on GitHub since release 7.13.0. The library's graphics rendering engine is available under the free BSD license; it was tweaked from AnyChart and open-sourced as a separate JavaScript API under the name of GraphicsJS in 2016.

== Awards ==
AnyChart has industry awards. In 2016, ProgrammableWeb named it one of the most interesting big data and analytics APIs.

In 2018, AnyChart won a DEVIES award at DeveloperWeek in California for the Best Innovation in JavaScript Technology.
