= John Victor Emms =

English painter

John Victor Emms (1912–1993) was an English landscape painter, who worked chiefly in oils and watercolours.

== Life and work ==
John Victor Emms was born in Bordon near Aldershot on 13 February 1912. His father, also called John Emms, was enrolled in the British armed forces. He studied art at Woolwich Polytechnic Art School under A. Buckley and L.S.M. Prince from 1930 to 1934, Hornsey School of Art under A.S.H. Mills and F. Mitchell from 1946 to 1948 and later at Goldsmiths' College School of Art from 1948 to 1949.

In 1948 he was awarded the Art Teachers Diploma and subsequently went on to teach at Raine's Foundation Grammar School and Woolwich Polytechnic Secondary Art School.

He lived in Leatherhead, Surrey, and signed his work "John V. Emms" to distinguish himself from the Victorian artist with the same name.

== Exhibitions ==
John Victor Emms exhibited widely in the United Kingdom. Two paintings titled Ramsgate and Mediterranean Harbour were exhibited at the Royal Academy in 1953 and 1958. Three of his paintings were purchased by Brighton Museum & Art Gallery with assistance from the Wilson Bequest in 1968.
