= ARTech Consultores SRL =

GeneXus
- Formerly: Artech Consultores SRL
- Company type: Private
- Industry: Software producer
- Founded: 1988; 38 years ago
- Founders: Breogán Gonda; Nicolás Jodal
- Headquarters: Montevideo, Uruguay
- Owner: Independent (1988–2022); Globant (2022–present)
- Website: www.genexus.com/en//

GeneXus (formerly Artech Consultores SRL) is a Uruguayan software producer, founded by Breogán Gonda and Nicolás Jodal in 1988. Its most famous product is Genexus, a software development tool that is sold to over 30 countries, having produced $50 million profits in the last year.

With the success of the tool, the company decided to change its name to Genexus SA. It was subsequently acquired by Globant on April 20, 2022.

== GeneXus ==
GeneXus is developed by ARTech.

GeneXus is a tool that works from "users’ visions"; it captures the knowledge contained in them and systematizes it within a knowledge base. From its knowledge base it is capable of designing, generating and maintaining 100% automatically the data base and application programs (programs that are necessary in order for the users to operate with their visions).
