= EMM (singer-songwriter) =

American alternative-pop singer-songwriter and record producer

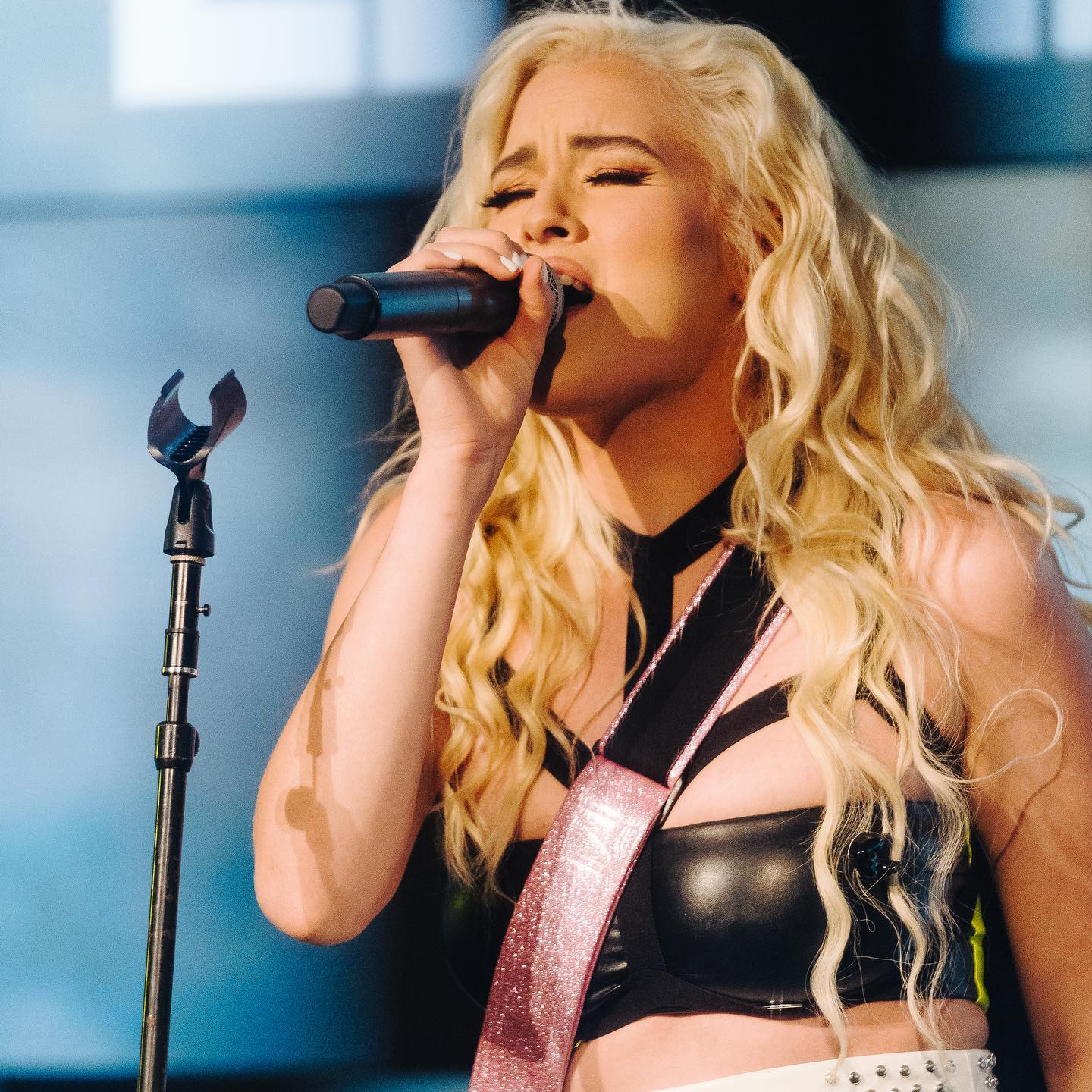
- EMM performing live at San Francisco Pride

Background information
- Born: Emma Norris; Traverse City, Michigan, U.S.
- Genres: Pop; Alternative pop; electronic
- Occupations: Singer; songwriter; record producer; multi-instrumentalist
- Instruments: Vocals; piano; guitar
- Years active: 2016–present

Emma Norris, known professionally as EMM, is an American singer, songwriter, record producer and multi-instrumentalist from Traverse City, Michigan.

Her releases include Burning in the Dark (2016), EMERALD (2019), RUBY (2020), SAPPHIRE (2021), EMM Live: Era I (2023), BLACK DIAMOND (2025), and GENESIS: The Live Album (2025).

Beginning with EMERALD, EMM developed an interconnected visual narrative centered on gemstone-themed characters. EMERALD, RUBY and SAPPHIRE depict successive stages of a superhero character's transformation, culminating in Diamond. BLACK DIAMOND centers on a separate supervillain character within the same fictional universe.

Her work has also addressed gender bias and women's empowerment. Notion described EMM as an advocate whose BLACK DIAMOND project challenges gender-based expectations, while her Genesis documentary focuses on the experiences of women working in the music industry.

== Early life ==
Norris was born and raised in Traverse City, Michigan. She grew up in a musical family.

Her father, Jeff Norris, is an opera singer and voice instructor who taught at the Interlochen Center for the Arts for several decades.

Her mother, Sylvia Norris, is a classical harpist who has served as principal harpist with the Traverse Symphony Orchestra and West Michigan Symphony Orchestra and has taught harp at Interlochen Arts Camp.

In a 2025 interview with Galore, Norris said that she began writing songs around the time of her first piano lessons and later studied guitar and voice as part of her classical music background. She also said that she moved to New York City as a teenager to pursue music.

== Career ==
=== 2016–2018: Career beginnings and Burning in the Dark ===
In 2016, Norris was among a group of emerging musicians profiled by USA Today for their use of the social-media application Flipagram to distribute music and connect with audiences.

Later that year, she released her first full-length project, Burning in the Dark. Norris has referred to the release as a mixtape.

In a later interview, Norris said that she wrote, recorded, produced, mixed and mastered Burning in the Dark herself. The twelve-track project includes "Killin All The Boyz", "Wrong", "Killer Queen", "Avalanche" and its title track.

EMM continued releasing music independently following the project, including the single "No Gods" in 2018.

=== 2019–2021: EMERALD, RUBY and SAPPHIRE ===
EMM released EMERALD in 2019, followed by RUBY in 2020. The projects subsequently formed part of the gemstone-themed visual narrative that continued with SAPPHIRE.

During this period, EMM also collaborated with electronic producers including Besomorph and Egzod. Releases through NoCopyrightSounds included "Afterlife" with Besomorph and "Don't Surrender" with Egzod.

In March 2021, Rolling Stone India featured EMM's song "Adderall" in its "Global Artists Spotlight". The publication described her as an "anti-pop" artist and identified the accompanying visual as the beginning of a three-part musical and visual project.

The narrative continued through the visual trilogy Act I: Adderall, Act II: Vice and Act III: End. EnVi Media described the story as following a female protagonist through Emerald, Ruby and Sapphire, with each character representing another stage in her transformation.

Shortly before the release of SAPPHIRE, EMM released "Strangers". EnVi Media described it as a self-produced ballad and noted that its restrained production contrasted with heavier songs such as "Rebecca" and "Devil in Disguise".

SAPPHIRE was released on June 18, 2021, alongside Act III: End, the final part of the trilogy. In the conclusion, Sapphire obtains the final gemstone and evolves into the character Diamond.

EMM also continued collaborating with NoCopyrightSounds artists in 2021, releasing "Shudder" with Jim Yosef and "Game Over" with Egzod.

=== 2023–present: Live projects, Genesis and BLACK DIAMOND ===
On June 23, 2023, EMM released EMM Live: Era I, a 15-track live album.

She later incorporated material from EMERALD, RUBY and SAPPHIRE into Genesis, a filmed live show and documentary project. The official project description identifies the live production as a three-act show based on the three mixtapes and the short film The Trilogy.

The accompanying documentary focuses on women working in music. Its official description states that female songwriters, dancers, musicians, independent artists and studio owners discuss challenges within the music industry while the film documents the development of the Genesis live show.

In 2024, EMM collaborated with Australian singer AViVA on the single "Godzilla", released on May 31.

In March 2025, EMM released BLACK DIAMOND. The project centers on Black Diamond, a supervillain character within EMM's gemstone-themed fictional universe.

In her Galore interview, EMM explained that Black Diamond is not the next transformation of Sapphire. She said that the originally planned successor to SAPPHIRE was DIAMOND, centered on the "ultimate superhero" in the fictional universe, while Black Diamond had originally existed as its villain.

Wonderland described BLACK DIAMOND as a fusion of dark pop, electronica and underground phonk influences. KALTBLUT Magazine described the album as combining electronic music with elements of gothic rock and characterized it as part of EMM's broader gemstone body of work.

The ten-track album contains "DON'T FORGIVE ME [INTRO]", "EAT MY ACID", "THANK YOU FOR RUINING MY LIFE", "MASTERMIND", "DON'T FEED THE DEMONS", "DUMB", "HERETIC [INTERLUDE]", "PEACHES & CREAM", "PYTHON" and "DELILAH".

On September 12, 2025, EMM released GENESIS: The Live Album, a 25-track recording of material from the live production.

== Artistry ==
=== Musical style and production ===
EMM's music has been described as anti-pop. Her later work has incorporated dark pop, electronic music and phonk, while KALTBLUT noted elements of gothic rock and industrial music in BLACK DIAMOND.

Norris has a classical music background in piano, guitar and voice. She has described that training as a foundation for her songwriting and musicianship, while also discussing her efforts to move away from some of those conventions when developing BLACK DIAMOND.

Self-production has played a role in her career. Norris said that she wrote, recorded, produced, mixed and mastered Burning in the Dark herself, and EnVi Media described "Strangers" as self-produced.

For BLACK DIAMOND, Norris worked with executive producer Nydge. In her 2025 Galore interview, she said that Nydge produced nine of the album's ten tracks and that she took a less hands-on production role than on some of her earlier releases.

=== Visual style and concepts ===
Visual storytelling is a recurring element of EMM's work. The EMERALD, RUBY and SAPPHIRE projects are connected through the gemstone-themed narrative developed in the three-part Adderall, Vice and End visual series.

EnVi Media described the trilogy as following a heroine who progresses through Emerald, Ruby and Sapphire before ultimately becoming Diamond.

BLACK DIAMOND approaches the fictional universe from a different perspective by centering its villain rather than continuing the protagonist's transformation. EMM has described the project as performance art using an exaggerated supervillain character to explore characteristics in women that she believes are frequently judged differently than similar characteristics in men.

The project's visual presentation incorporates camp, horror and supernatural imagery. Notion described Black Diamond as a supervillain used to examine the social tendency to portray powerful women as threatening.

== Public image ==
EMM's visual presentation has frequently incorporated theatrical fictional personas tied to her music. The Emerald, Ruby and Sapphire characters were developed as successive forms of the same heroine within her music-video narrative.

The BLACK DIAMOND era introduced a darker, deliberately confrontational character. Notion described the project as using camp and performance art to challenge gender bias, while Wonderland described its supervillain framing as a commentary on the way women who reject conventional expectations can be portrayed negatively.

Norris has distinguished the Black Diamond persona from herself, describing the character as an exaggerated fictional supervillain created as part of the album's performance-art concept.

== Advocacy and activism ==
Women's empowerment and gender inequality have been recurring themes in EMM's public work. Notion described her as an advocate whose BLACK DIAMOND project seeks to challenge gender biases and encourage discussion surrounding gender and equality.

EMM has also been associated with an initiative called Emmpowerment. Too Much Love described Emmpowerment as a platform through which EMM has sought to create a space where young women can feel seen and heard.

Her Genesis documentary also focuses on women in the music industry. The project's official description states that it features women working as songwriters, dancers, musicians, independent artists and studio owners discussing challenges they have encountered in the industry.

Gender bias is also a central theme of BLACK DIAMOND. Notion described the project as using the Black Diamond character to examine differing societal responses to power, sexuality and self-expression depending on gender.

== Discography ==
=== Albums and mixtapes ===
Albums and mixtapes
Year	Title	Type
2016	Burning in the Dark	Mixtape
2019	EMERALD	Mixtape
2020	RUBY	Mixtape
2021	SAPPHIRE	Mixtape
2023	EMM Live: Era I	Live album
2025	BLACK DIAMOND	Album
2025	GENESIS: The Live Album	Live album

=== Singles ===
Selected singles
Year	Title
2017	"Killer Queen (Thrones Remix)"
2017	"Avalanche (Gravitrax Remix)"
2018	"No Gods"
2019	"The Season"
2019	"Freedom (Sulvida Remix)"
2019	"Adderall"
2020	"Never Come Down"
2020	"Psycho (Radio Edit)"
2020	"Outcry"
2020	"Don't Surrender" (with Egzod)
2020	"Afterlife" (with Besomorph)
2020	"Spock"
2020	"Peachy (Clean Version)"
2020	"Ego Overdose"
2021	"Shudder" (with Jim Yosef)
2021	"Game Over" (with Egzod)
2023	"Burn in Hell"
2024	"Superfreak"
2024	"Godzilla" (with AViVA)
2024	"DON'T FEED THE DEMONS"
2024	"PYTHON"
2024	"MASTERMIND"
2025	"PEACHES & CREAM"
2026	"GOODGRRL REMIX"

== Tours and live performances ==
=== Headlining tours ===
- The DUMB Tour (2026)

EMM announced The DUMB Tour in October 2025 as a headlining tour beginning January 10, 2026, in West Palm Beach, Florida. The initial announcement included 37 cities in the United States and Canada, including Atlanta, Nashville, New York City, Chicago, Los Angeles and Toronto. The announcement also stated that additional international dates were planned.

The tour incorporates material from BLACK DIAMOND alongside songs from EMM's earlier catalog, with live instrumentation, choreography and theatrical staging centered on the Black Diamond character. Music Scene Media, reviewing the Dallas stop, described the production as combining alternative pop, dark pop and electronic music with dancers and theatrical presentation.

=== Supporting and opening acts ===
Supporting and opening performers have varied between stops on The DUMB Tour. Selected documented lineups include:

Date	City	Venue	Supporting or opening act(s)
February 12, 2026	Dallas, Texas	Puzzles Deep Ellum	Briar Rose; moonstone.
July 7, 2026	Portland, Oregon	Dante's	TeZATalks; Papa Titty; Miss Jaxon
August 19, 2026	Washington, D.C.	Songbyrd Music House	Bentley Robles; Venetian; Calyope
August 20, 2026	Philadelphia, Pennsylvania	Nikki Lopez Philly	Bentley Robles; Kyle Payne

Music Scene Media reported that Dallas-based alternative-pop band moonstone. joined EMM for the Austin, Dallas and Houston stops of the tour. The Dallas performance additionally opened with an interpretive-dance set by Briar Rose.

=== Pride appearances ===
EMM has also appeared at several Pride events, both as a headlining performer and as a guest.

Year	Event	Location	Role
2025	Up North Pride	Traverse City, Michigan	Headliner
2026	Pittsburgh Pride	Pittsburgh, Pennsylvania	Headliner
2026	LA Pride	Los Angeles, California	Special guest during Bentley Robles' set

In September 2025, EMM returned to her hometown of Traverse City to headline Up North Pride's first Pride Concert at the city's Open Space. Local publication Northern Express described the performance as a homecoming concert.

In 2026, EMM was announced as a headlining performer at Pittsburgh Pride alongside other scheduled performers including Chrissy Chlapecka and Cain Culto. She also appeared at LA Pride as a special guest during Bentley Robles' Pride Village performance.
