= Artech (staffing company) =

IT staffing firm

Coordinates: 40.76778°N 74.49885°W

Artech Information Systems
- Type: Public
- Industry: Temping agency
- Founded: 1992; 34 years ago
- Founders: Ajay Poddar and Ranjini Poddar
- Headquarters: Morristown, New Jersey, United States
- Number of locations: 38
- Area served: Worldwide
- Key people: Ranjini Poddar (CEO and Co-Founder); Ajay Poddar (Co-Founder & Executive Vice President)
- Services: IT staffing; consulting; outsourcing; Employment agency; Human Resource Consulting
- Subsidiaries: Scalence
- Website: www.artech.com

Artech is an American employment agency that provides IT staffing services by placing IT professionals to fill technology-related roles on temporary, permanent or contract basis. It also provides outsourcing of IT roles.

== Overview ==
As of 2019, Artech was the largest woman-owned IT staffing company in the US, and had around 10,500 IT staff on its books. The company also provides project management services, focusing on women and minority hires.

By 2011, it was operating in Canada, forty US states, China, and India, with $328.3 million in revenues, growing 83% since the previous year.

== History ==
Artech Information Systems was co-founded in 1992 by Ajay and Ranjini Poddar, and is headquartered in Morristown, New Jersey. Early clients for the company included the Port Authority of New York and New Jersey and General Electric. Artech matches candidates with client firms based on their demands for special skills. Ranjini Poddar serves as the company’s CEO.

Artech is a cofounder of a women-focused information technology center at Banasthali Vidyapeeth University in Rajasthan, India, called the Artech-Dalmia Centre for Information Technology.

In 2014 Artech acquired Vega Consulting and in 2017 Artech acquired Tech-Pro Inc.

In 2018, Artech acquired the talent and technology services business unit of CDI.

In 2020, Artech was the subject to a ransomware attack that affected its personnel database.

== Recognition ==
Artech has received several awards and recognitions over the years:

- In 2015, the company received the Sponsors Appreciation Award from the New York & New Jersey Minority Supplier Development Council (NYNJMSDC).
- Artech was ranked #31 on NJBIZ's "Top 100 Privately-Held Companies" list in 2015.
- In 2016, Artech was listed among the Top 250 Privately Held Companies in New Jersey by NJBIZ.
- In 2020, the company was named a Fast 100 Asian American Business by the US Pan Asian American Chamber of Commerce Education Foundation (USPAACC).
