= Caspio =

American software company

- Type: Private
- Industry: Enterprise Software; Low-Code Development Platform; Digital Transformation
- Founded: March 2000
- Headquarters: Sunnyvale, California
- Key people: Frank Zamani, Founder
- Products: Caspio Low-Code Platform; Caspio Professional Services
- Number of employees: 130
- Website: www.caspio.com

Caspio, Inc. is an American software company providing a low-code platform for building cloud-based business applications. Founded in 2000 by Frank Zamani, the company is headquartered in Sunnyvale, California, with operations in Poland, the Philippines, and Spain. Caspio’s platform allows organizations to create online database applications and workflow tools without extensive coding.

== History ==
Caspio was founded by Frank Zamani in 2000. The company initially focused on simplifying custom cloud applications and reducing development time and cost as compared to traditional software development.

Caspio released the first version of its platform, Caspio Bridge, in 2001. In 2014, Caspio released a HIPAA-Compliant Edition of its low-code application development platform.

Caspio also released an EU General Data Protection Regulation (GDPR) Compliance Edition of its low-code application development platform in 2016. Caspio's second European Software Development Center opened in Kraków, Poland in 2017. In 2019, Forrester Research listed Caspio and three other platforms in its highest of four ranked tiers of twelve low-code platforms for business developers based on rankings of offerings and strategy at that time. Caspio also opened data centers in Montreal, Canada and India in 2020.
