= WaveMaker =

Low-code programming platform

WaveMaker, Inc.
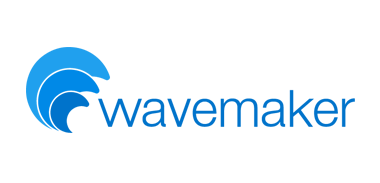
- Type: Private
- Industry: Rapid Application Development; Low-code Platform aPaaS; Digital Transformation; Agile Software Development; Enterprise Software; Cloud computing Computer Software
- Founded: 2003
- Headquarters: Mountain View, CA
- Key people: Vijay Pullur, CEO
- Products: WaveMaker low code Studio & Platform
- Number of employees: Approximately 250 (2016)
- Website: www.wavemaker.com

WaveMaker is a Java-based low-code development platform designed for building software applications and platforms. The company, WaveMaker Inc., is based in Mountain View, California. The platform is marketed as a tool for application development and IT modernization. It is also used by independent software vendors (ISVs) as a component within their products.

The platform is licensed to organizations to set up a platform-as-a-service (PaaS) environment for developing and running applications. It can be used by both developers and business users to build applications. These applications support API integration, data visualization, and responsive user interfaces.

Applications built on the platform can be deployed on public or private cloud infrastructure.Containers can be deployed on top of virtual machines or directly on bare metal. The software includes a graphical user interface (GUI) console for managing infrastructure using Docker containerization.

The platform provides features for application deployment, lifecycle and release management, deployment workflows, and access control:

- Apps for web, tablet, and smartphone interfaces
- Enterprise technologies like Java, Hibernate, Spring, AngularJS, JQuery
- Docker-provided APIs and CLI
- Software stack packaging, container provisioning, stack and app upgrading, replication, and fault tolerance

== WaveMaker Studio ==
The platform centers around WaveMaker Studio, a WYSIWYG rapid development tool utilizing a drag-and-drop interface. WaveMaker Studio supports rapid application development (RAD) for the web, similar to what products like PowerBuilder and Lotus Notes provided for client-server computing.

Applications developed with WaveMaker Studio are cross-platform, supporting deployment to personal computers, mobile phones, and tablets. Applications created using the WaveMaker Studio follow a model–view–controller architecture.

WaveMaker Studio has been downloaded more than two million times. The Studio community consists of 30,000 registered users. Applications generated by WaveMaker Studio are licensed under the Apache license.

Studio 8 was released on September 25, 2015. In previous versions, such as Studio 7, the software underwent architectural updates. It was based on AngularJS framework, previous Studio versions (6.7, 6.6, 6.5) use the Dojo Toolkit. Some of the features WaveMaker Studio 7 include:

- Automatic generation of Hibernate mapping, and Hibernate queries from database schema import.
- Automatic creation of Enterprise Data Widgets based on schema import. Each widget can display data from a database table as a grid or edit form. Edit form implements create, update, and delete functions automatically.
- WYSIWYG Ajax development studio runs in a browser.
- Deployment to Tomcat, IBM WebSphere, Weblogic, JBoss.
- Mashup tool to assemble web applications based on SOAP, REST and RSS web services, Java Services and databases.
- Supports existing CSS, HTML and Java code.
- The ability to deploy a standard Java .war file.

== Technologies and frameworks ==
WaveMaker allows users to build applications that run on "Open Systems Stack" based on the following technologies and frameworks: AngularJS, Bootstrap, NVD3, HTML, CSS, Apache Cordova, Hibernate, Spring, Spring Security, Java. The various supported integrations include:

- Databases: Oracle, MySQL, Microsoft SQL Server, PostgreSQL, IBM DB2, HSQLDB
- Authentication: LDAP, Active Directory, CAS, Custom Java Service, Database
- Version Control: Bitbucket (or Stash), GitHub, Apache Subversion
- Deployment: Amazon AWS, Microsoft Azure, WaveMaker Private Cloud (Docker containerization), IBM Web Sphere, Apache Tomcat, SpringSource tcServer, Oracle WebLogic Server, JBoss(WildFly), GlassFish
- App Stores: Google Play, Apple App Store, Windows Store

== History ==
In 2003, WaveMaker was founded as ActiveGrid. Then, in 2007, it was rebranded as Wavemaker. It was acquired by VMware in 2011. In March 2013, support for the WaveMaker project was discontinued.

In May 2013, Pramati Technologies acquired the assets of WaveMaker. In February 2014, Wavemaker Studio 6.7 was released, which was the last open source version of Studio. In September 2014 WaveMaker Inc. launched the WaveMaker RAD Platform, which allowed organizations to run their own application platform for building and running apps.

In March 2023, WaveMaker released version 11.5, introducing artificial intelligence-driven tools to the application development environment.
