= No-code development platform =

Software development without writing code

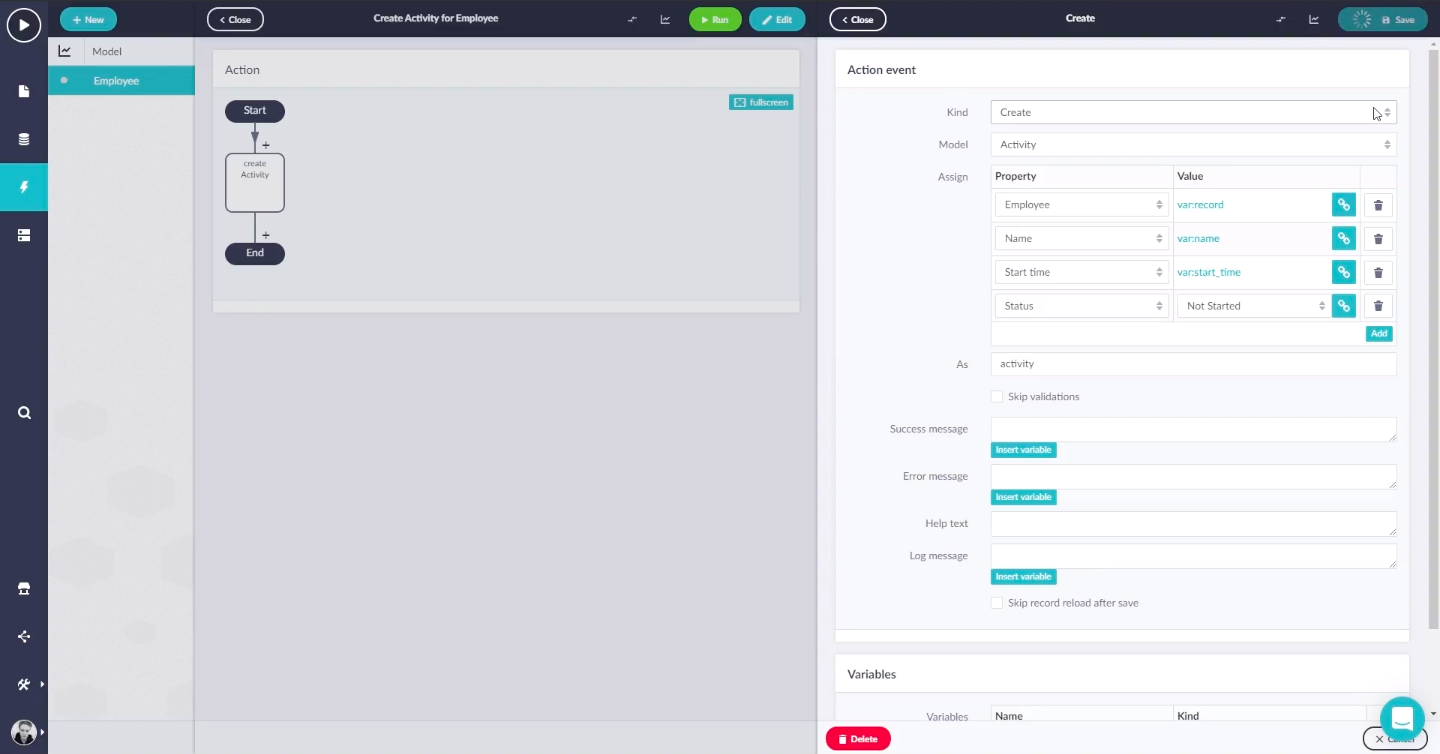
Flowchart interface for Betty Blocks, a no-code platform

A no-code development platform (NCDP) supports creating software via a graphical user interface (GUI) and configuration instead of programming.

As with a low-code development platform, it is meant to expedite application development, but completely eliminates writing code. This is usually accomplished by offering prebuilt templates. In the 2010s, both of these types of platforms increased in popularity as companies dealt with a limited supply of competent software developers.

No-code development is closely related to visual programming.

== Use ==
No-code tools are often designed with line of business users in mind as opposed to traditional IT. These platforms allow users to build tools and applications with little to no programming expertise.

A potential benefit of using a NCDP is increased agility. NCDPs typically provide some degree of templated user-interface and user experience functionality for common needs such as forms, workflows, and data display allowing creators to expedite parts of the app creation process.

== See also ==
- AI-assisted software development
- Flow-based programming
- List of online database creator apps
- Low-code development platforms
- Rapid application development
- Lean software development
- Platform as a service
- Vibe coding
