= Bubble (programming language) =

Visual programming language

Bubble is a visual programming language developed by Bubble Group designed for building web and mobile applications.

It is a no-code development platform that allows users to create web applications through a visual interface without writing code. It offers tools for designing, building, and deploying applications, making it accessible to users without technical expertise.

== Overview ==
Bubble's visual development platform is used to create websites and web applications. It is used by non-technical start-up founders, in schools for educational purposes, and by other organizations for commercial purposes.

Bubble is used by absolute beginners to practice making websites, or by more advanced people to make websites.

Competitors to Bubble.io in the visual programming and no-code industry include FlutterFlow, Microsoft Power Apps, and Adalo

== History ==
Bubble was founded by Emmanuel Straschnov and Josh Haas in 2012 in New York. Bubble had been bootstrapped for a long time but eventually started receiving investments. In 2019, Bubble raised $6M from SignalFire, Neo, Nas, Eric Ries and the founders of Warby Parker, Allbirds, Okta, and Harry's. In 2021, Bubble raised $100M. Bubble was named one of Fast Company's Most Innovative Companies of 2021.

== Major events ==
=== 2023 pricing model controversy ===
In April 2023, Bubble.io announced a controversial change to its pricing model, introducing a new metric called "workload units." This change followed an earlier attempt in March 2022 to shift the pricing model based on database entries, which had also been met with considerable backlash from the user community.

The goal of the new pricing model was to address sustainability issues due to most users running on lower pricing tiers regardless of their usage or size. Bubble.io aimed to align its revenue more closely with the scaling of users' applications on their platform, rather than relying on capacity.

However, the changes sparked significant controversy within the Bubble.io community. The announcement thread on the company's forum quickly garnered over 2000 replies, with many users expressing dissatisfaction and threatening to leave the platform. Critics argued that the new pricing model could lead to disproportionate costs and felt that their needs and concerns were not adequately considered before the implementation of the change. Amid this uproar, Bubble.io founder Emanuel also received personal death threats, underscoring the intensity of the backlash and the challenges faced by the company during this period.

Bubble.io responded to the criticism by reaching out to affected users individually to provide optimization support and held a live webinar to provide further guidance and elaboration on the changes. The company also committed to improving bulk data operations, an area of concern highlighted by users, and to make file storage more affordable in the new pricing model.

Despite the controversy, Bubble.io founder Emmanuel Straschnov stated that "Most apps will have a sufficient amount of workload included in their plan and won’t need to subscribe to an additional tier," suggesting that the new model was designed to cater to a majority of users without imposing additional costs.

=== 2024 Flusk acquisition ===
In October 2024, Bubble acquired Flusk—a community-created security and monitoring tool built specifically for Bubble apps. Deal terms weren’t disclosed; Flusk co-founders Victor Nihoul and Wesley Wasielewski joined Bubble.
