= Low-code development platform =

Software development with little code writing

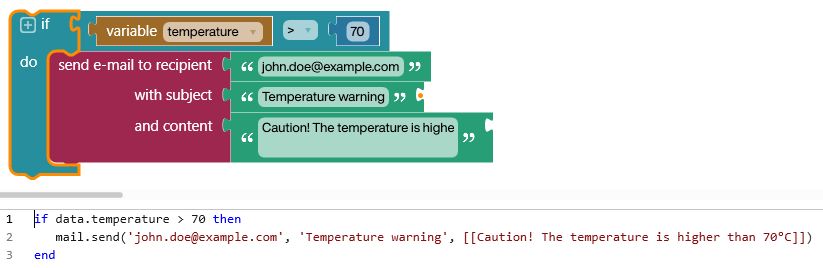
A visual low-code editor that enables the creation of process logics without programming knowledge, illustrated with an example from Peakboard

A low-code development platform (LCDP) provides a software development environment – typically a graphical user interface (GUI) – that involves little or no writing of code. A low-code platform may produce entirely operational applications, or require additional coding for specific situations. Low-code development platforms are typically on a high abstraction level, and can reduce the amount of traditional time spent, enabling accelerated delivery of business applications. A common benefit is that a wider range of people can contribute to the application's development, not only those with coding skills, but good governance is needed to be able to adhere to common rules and regulations. LCDPs can also lower the initial cost of setup, training, deployment, and maintenance.

Low-code development platforms trace their roots back to fourth-generation programming language and the rapid application development tools of the 1990s and early 2000s. Similar to these predecessor development environments, LCDPs are based on the principles of model-driven architecture, automatic code generation, and visual programming. The concept of end-user development also existed previously, although LCDPs brought some new ways of approaching this development. The low-code development platform market traces its origins back to 2011. The specific name "low-code" was not put forward until 9 June 2014, when it was used by the industry analyst Forrester Research. Along with no-code development platforms, low-code was described as "extraordinarily disruptive" in Forbes magazine in 2017.

== Use ==
As a result of the microcomputer revolution, businesses have deployed computers widely across their employee bases, enabling widespread automation of business processes using software. The need for software automation and new applications for business processes places demands on software developers to create custom applications in volume, tailoring them to organizations' unique needs. Low-code development platforms have been developed as a means to allow for quick creation and use of working applications that can address the specific process and data needs of the organization.

== Reception ==
Research firm Forrester estimated in 2016 that the total market for low-code development platforms would grow to $15.5 billion by 2020. Segments in the market include database, request handling, mobile, process, and general purpose low-code platforms.

Low-code development's market growth can be attributed to its flexibility and ease. Low-code development platforms are shifting their focus toward general purpose applications, with the ability to add in custom code when needed or desired.

Mobile accessibility is one of the driving factors of using low-code development platforms. Instead of developers having to spend time creating multi-device software, low-code packages typically come with that feature as standard.

Because they require less coding knowledge, nearly anyone in a software development environment can learn to use a low-code development platform. Features like drag and drop interfaces help users visualize and build the application

== Security and compliance concerns ==
Concerns over low-code development platform security and compliance are growing, especially for apps that use consumer data. There can be concerns over the security of apps built so quickly and possible lack of due governance leading to compliance issues. However, low-code apps do also fuel security innovations. With continuous app development in mind, it becomes easier to create secure data workflows.

== Criticisms ==
Some IT professionals question whether low-code development platforms are suitable for large-scale and mission-critical enterprise applications. Others have questioned whether these platforms actually make development cheaper or easier. Additionally, some CIOs have expressed concern that adopting low-code development platforms internally could lead to an increase in unsupported applications built by shadow IT.

== See also ==
- DRAKON
- End-user computing
- End-user development
- Flow-based programming
- List of online database creator apps
- List of low-code development platforms
- Visual programming language
- Backend as a service
