= NASA's Eyes =

Computer visualization software

NASA's Eyes Visualization

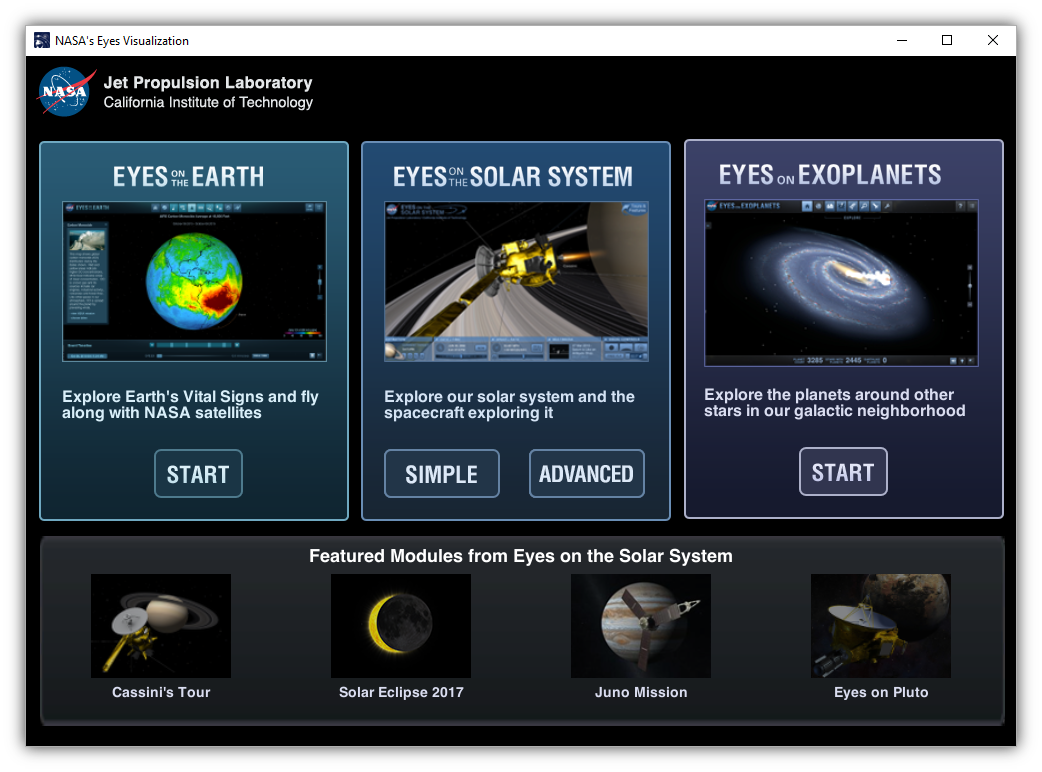
- Splash screen in Windows 10
- Developer: Jet Propulsion Laboratory
- Release: c. 2010; 16 years ago
- Operating system: macOS, Microsoft Windows
- Type: Educational software, virtual globe
- License: Public domain
- Website: eyes.nasa.gov

NASA's Eyes Visualization (also known as simply NASA's Eyes) is a freely available suite of computer visualization applications created by the Visualization Technology Applications and Development Team at NASA's Jet Propulsion Laboratory (JPL) to render scientifically accurate views of the planets studied by JPL missions and the spacecraft used in that study. The Eyes family of products is available for desktop computers running Windows 7+, and Mac OSX 10.8+. Deep Space Network Now and Experience Curiosity are web-based and available across all platforms. 3D models of spacecraft and other objects are displayed with the option of comparing their size to a human, school bus, or football stadium.

The visualization team is led by Kevin Hussey, a former technology manager at Walt Disney Animation Studios. Hussey is trained in climatic geomorphology and remote sensing.

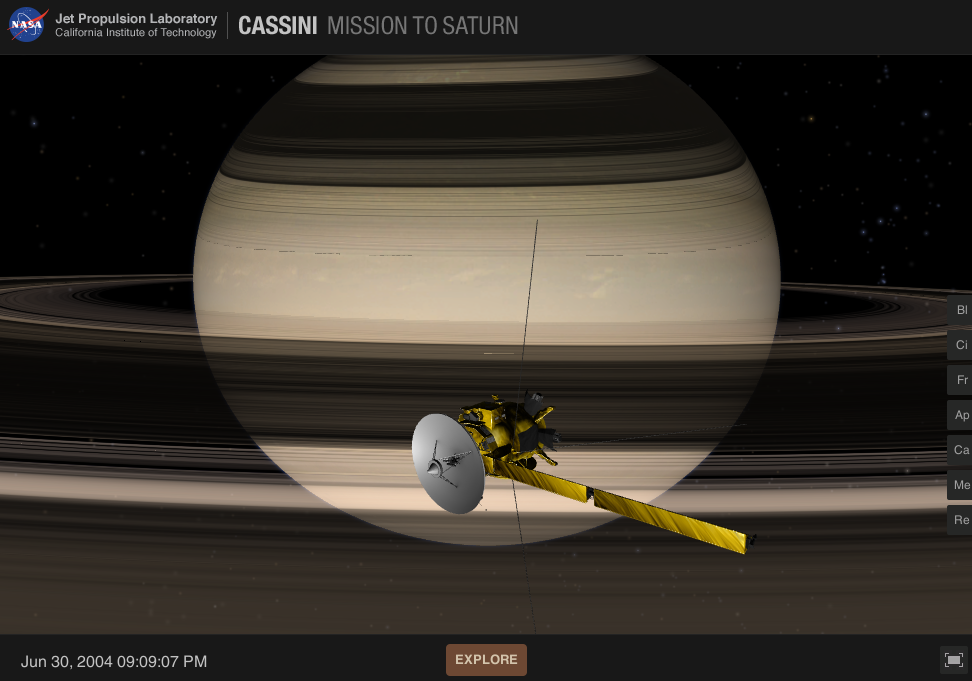

== Eyes on the Solar System ==
Initially released in 2010, Eyes on the Solar System was the first in the Eyes family. Eyes on the Solar System provides realistic simulated views of spacecraft, planets and other features within the Solar System. The position and orientation of spacecraft and planets represented in the software are based on real data from JPL. Initial releases in 2010 required users to install the Unity game engine for rendering. Since mid-2012 the application has been Java based. Simple and advanced modes are offered.

The application receives regular updates with modules featuring timely events such as the end of the Cassini mission, and arrival of spacecraft such as MAVEN to Mars and the Solar eclipse of August 21, 2017. The application received heavy use during the entry, descent and landing of the Mars Science Laboratory (MSL). The landing of MSL brought an additional 739,000 visits, and 20 terabytes of data was streamed from JPL servers that weekend in support of the software. The touchdown time of the rover in the software was predicted weeks ahead of time by the team planning the spacecraft trajectory, and was accurate within a fraction of a second.

== Eyes on the Exoplanets ==
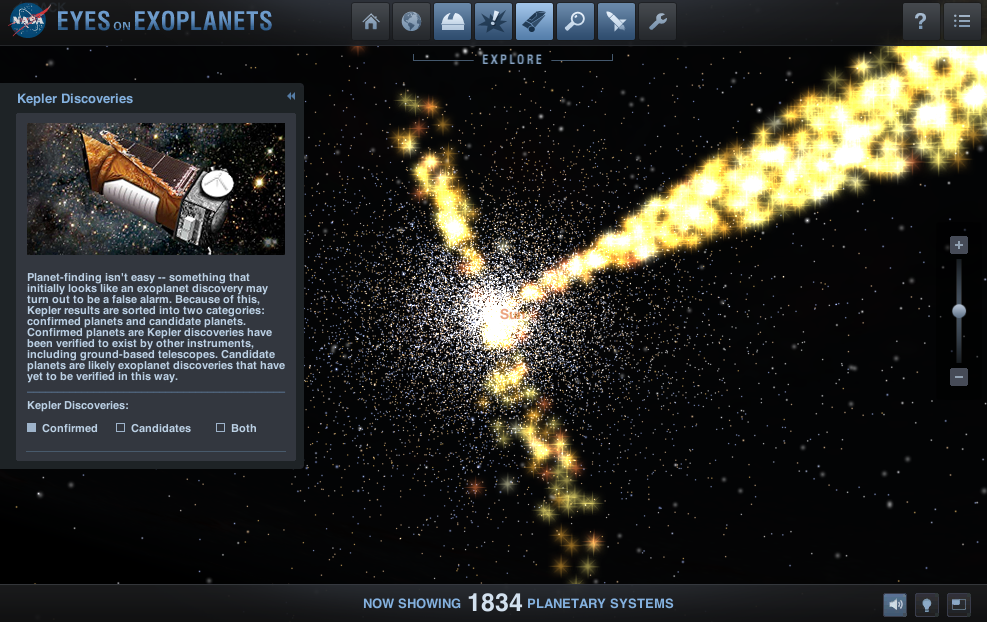

Based on data from the NASA exoplanet archive, Eyes on the Exoplanet enables users to zoom in on more than 1000 planets orbiting distant stars. Exoplanets can be filtered by relevant criteria such as Earth-sized, large rocky planets, gas giants, etc. Distances to these planets are expressed in travel time by car, plane, etc.

== Eyes on the Earth ==
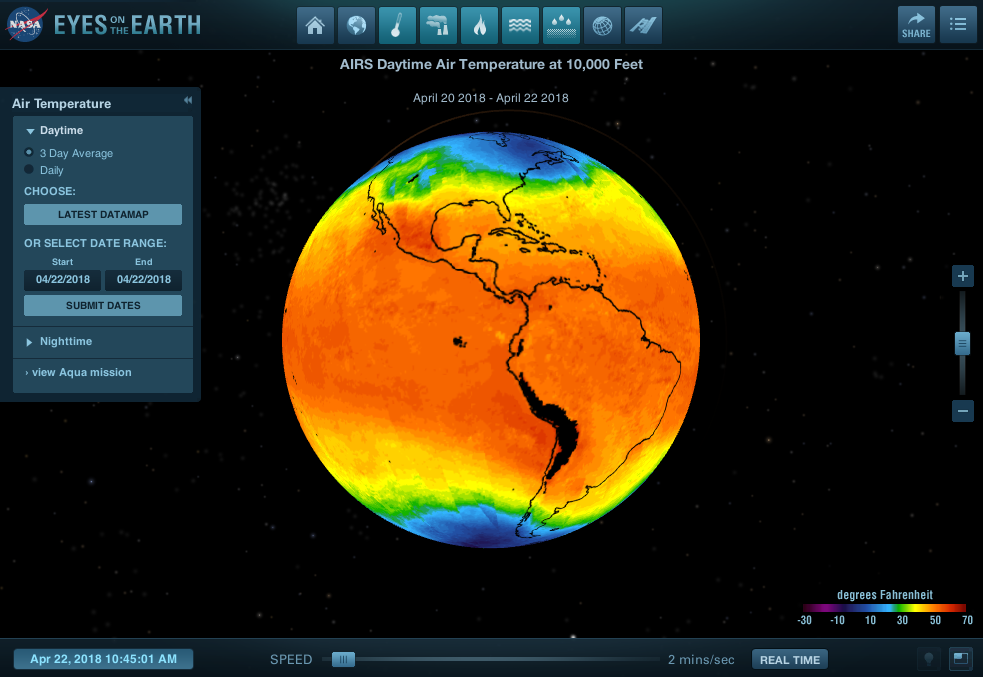

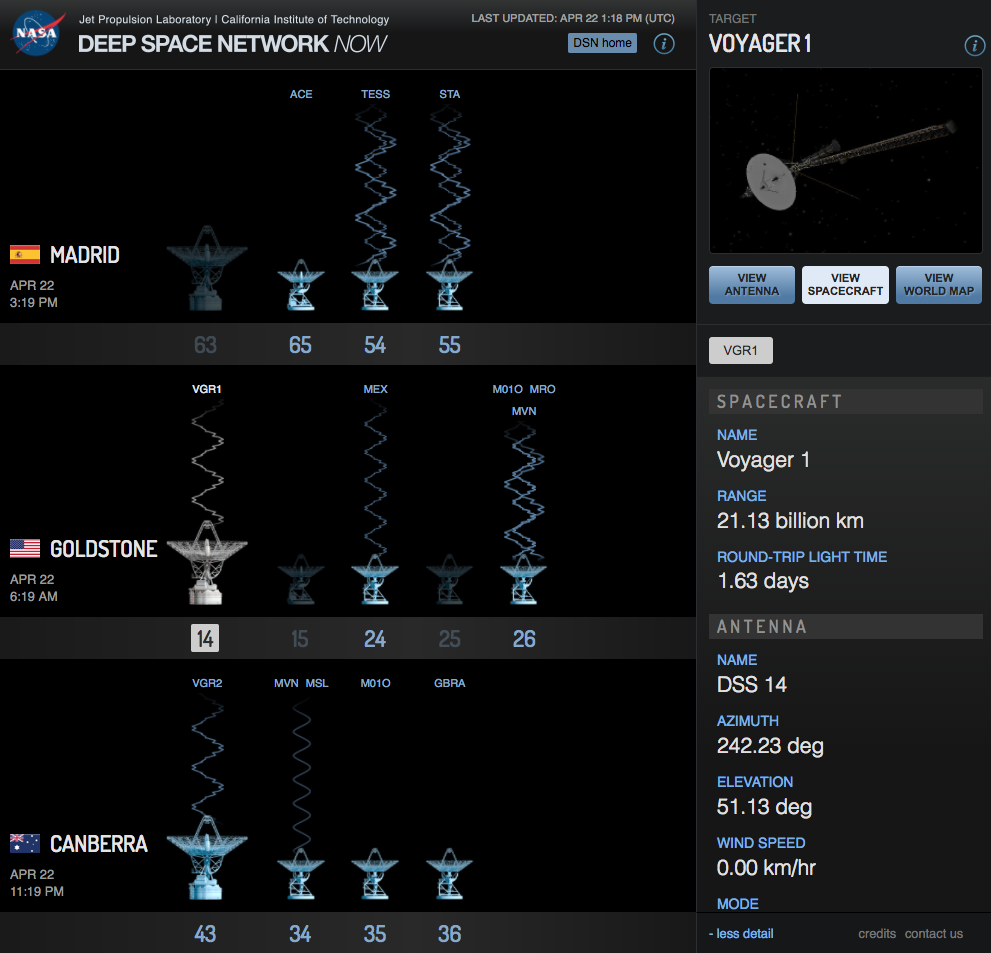

Eyes on the Earth visualizes a number of NASA's Earth orbiting spacecraft in-situ and the data they collect on the Earth itself. Originally released as a Unity web player interactive, it has undergone a number of iterations including the mobile app "Earth Now".

The application displays measurements such as sea level height, atmospheric carbon dioxide concentration and Antarctic ozone. Trace the movement of water around the globe using the gravity map from NASA's GRACE satellites. Recent events such as dust storms, volcanic eruptions and fires are displayed as well.

The position of NASA's fleet of Earth-observing missions is also displayed in real time.

== Deep Space Network Now ==
Based on information from the NASA Deep Space Network, Deep Space Network Now is a web application which displays status of live communication with all exploratory spacecraft beyond low Earth orbit. The application displays information about the ground-based antenna in use, the spacecraft communicating and details such as the distance in light hours to the spacecraft.

== Experience Curiosity ==
Experience Curiosity is an interactive web application created to celebrate the third anniversary of the Curiosity rover landing on Mars. This 3D serious game makes enables users to operate the rover, control its cameras and the robotic arm and reproduces some of the prominent events of the Mars Science Laboratory mission. The application was presented at the beginning of the WebGL section at SIGGRAPH 2015.

According to Brian Kumanchik, the lead and art director behind the project, the development team used exclusively open-source software including Blender and GIMP for creating 3D content, particularly due to public accessibility of open source formats. The Blend4Web framework was chosen as a 3D engine which is integrated with Blender, includes a physics engine and provides rendering in mobile browsers.

== Awards ==
- 2016 Webby Award for best "Government & Civil Innovation" website for Experience Curiosity
- 2009 Webby Award for best "Global Climate Change" website for Eyes on the Earth
