= Blend4Web =

Free open-source framework

- Developer: Triumph LLC
- Release: March 28, 2014; 12 years ago
- Final release: 18.05 / June 6, 2018; 8 years ago
- Written in: JavaScript, Python, C, C++
- Type: 3D engine
- License: GPLv3 or commercial
- Website: www.blend4web.com

Blend4Web is a free and open source framework for creating and displaying interactive 3D computer graphics in web browsers.

== Overview ==
The Blend4Web framework leverages Blender to edit 3D scenes. Content rendering relies on WebGL, Web Audio, WebVR, and other web standards, without the use of plug-ins.

It is dual-licensed. The framework is distributed under the free and open source GPLv3 and, a non-free license - with the source code being hosted on GitHub.

A 3D scene can be prepared in Blender and then exported as a pair of JSON and binary files to load in a web application. It can also be exported as a single, self-contained HTML file, in which exported data, the web player GUI, and the engine itself are packed. The HTML option is considered to be the simplest way. The resulting file, which has a minimum size of 1 MB, can be embedded in a web page using a standard iframe HTML element. Blend4Web-powered web applications can be deployed on social networking websites such as Facebook.

The Blend4Web toolchain consists of JavaScript libraries, the Blender add-on, and a set of tools for tweaking 3D scene parameters, debugging, and optimization.

Developed by Moscow-based company Triumph in 2010, Blend4Web was publicly released on March 28, 2014.

At the end of 2017, the project founders Yuri and Alex Kovelenov quit Triumph to start the development of a new WebGL framework Verge3D.

In October 2019, an "Absolutely new Blend4Web" was announced, planned to make developing 3D apps easier and to add a new marketplace where people can offer their 3D models.

== History ==
Blend4Web was developed by Triumph LLC, a Moscow-based company founded in 2010. The framework was publicly released on March 28, 2014, as a free and open-source framework for creating interactive 3D graphics in web browsers using WebGL.

The final release, version 18.05, was published on June 6, 2018. Following this, the project's main developers—founders Yuri and Kovelenov—left Triumph in 2017 to develop Verge3D, a successor WebGL framework. Blend4Web has since been in maintenance mode, with the codebase remaining available on GitHub under GPLv3 and commercial licenses.

== Architecture ==
Blend4Web operates as a bridge between Blender and web browsers. A 3D scene is prepared in Blender using the Blend4Web add-on, then exported as JSON and binary files or as a self-contained HTML file that can be embedded via an iframe element.

The framework relies on web standards including WebGL, Web Audio, and WebXR (formerly WebVR), without requiring browser plug-ins.

== Features ==
The framework has a number of components typically found in game engines, including a positional audio system, physics engine (a fork of Bullet ported to JavaScript), animation system, and an abstraction layer for game logic programming.

Up to 8 different types of animations can be assigned to a single object, including skeletal and per-vertex animation. The speed and the direction of animation (forward/backward play), as well as particle system parameters (size, initial velocity, and count), can be changed through the API.

Among other supported features are: scene data dynamic loading and unloading, subsurface scattering simulation, and image-based lighting.

Some out-of-box options exist for rendering extended outdoor environments, including foliage-wind interaction, water, atmosphere, and sunlight simulation. One example demonstrating these effects is "The Farm" tech demo, which also features multiple animated NPCs and the ability to walk, interact with objects and drive a vehicle in first-person mode.

Being based on the cross-browser WebGL API, Blend4Web runs in the majority of web browsers, including mobile ones. There are some caveats for browsers with experimental WebGL support, such as Internet Explorer. There are also applications developed to run on Tizen-powered devices such as the Samsung Gear S2 smartwatch.

Other features include: draw call batching, hidden surface determination, threaded physics simulation and ocean simulation.

In version 14.09, Blend4Web introduced the possibility of adding interactivity to 3D scenes using a visual programming tool. The tool is reminiscent of the BGE's logic editor as it uses logic blocks that are placed inside Blender. It plays back animation tracks authored by an artist when the user interacts with predefined 3D objects.

Since version 15.03, Blend4Web has supported attaching HTML elements (such as information windows) to 3D objects ("annotations") and copying objects in run time ("instancing").

The following post-processing effects are supported: glow, bloom, depth of field, crepuscular rays, motion blur, and screen space ambient occlusion.

== Virtual reality and augmented reality ==
Virtual reality devices have been supported since the end of 2015. Specifically, Oculus Rift head-mounted display works over experimental WebVR API.

The software also now includes preliminary support for gamepads, based on the Gamepad API.

In 2017, the option to author augmented reality content was added. The system is based on the open-source tracking library ARToolKit and uses the WebRTC protocols.

Starting from version 17.08, finger tracking is supported through the Leap Motion device.

== Blender integration ==
The Blender add-on is written in Python and C and can be compiled for the Linux x86/x64, OS X x64, and MS Windows x86/x64 platforms.

A Blend4Web-specific profile can be activated in the add-on settings. When switching to this profile, the Blender interface changes so that it only reveals settings relevant to Blend4Web.

Blend4Web supports a set of Blender-specific features such as the node material editor (a tool for visual shader programming) and the particle system. There is basic support for Blender's non-linear animation (NLA) editor for creating simple scenarios.

Blend4Web is based on Blender's real-time GLSL rendering engine, which users are recommended to use in order to enable WYSIWYG editing.

== Notable uses ==
NASA developed an interactive web application called Experience Curiosity to celebrate the 3rd anniversary of the Curiosity rover landing on Mars. This Blend4Web-based app makes it possible to operate the rover, control its cameras and the robotic arm, and reproduce some of the prominent events of the Mars Science Laboratory mission. The application got presented at the beginning of the WebGL section at SIGGRAPH 2015.

Experience Curiosity was ported to Verge3D for Blender in 2018 with several performance improvements and bug fixes.

A General Motors authorized dealer in the United Arab Emirates has placed a functional Chevrolet Camaro 3D configurator on its website.

Greenpeace created interactive 3D infographics to back Greenpeace's Detox campaign in Russia. Tallink featured an interactive 3D presentation of its MS Megastar vessel to allow visitors to browse details of the ship.

== Legacy and development status ==
As of 2024, Blend4Web is no longer actively developed; the final stable release remains version 18.05 (June 2018). The project is maintained as open-source on GitHub, and the framework continues to be used in archived or stable production deployments.

The developers' transition to Verge3D reflects industry movement toward more actively maintained 3D web frameworks in the 2020s.

== See also ==
- Verge3D
- Blender
- WebGL
- List of WebGL frameworks
