= Verge3D =

Real-time renderer and toolkit software

- Developer: Soft8Soft
- Release: November 22, 2017; 8 years ago
- Stable release: 4.13 / 15 July 2026; 1 day ago
- Preview release: 4.13 pre2 / 25 June 2026; 21 days ago
- Written in: JavaScript, Python, GLSL
- Operating system: Windows, macOS, ChromeOS, Linux
- Platform: x86-64, Apple silicon
- Size: 145-153 MiB (varies by version)
- Type: 3D engine
- License: Trialware
- Website: www.soft8soft.com

Verge3D is a real-time renderer and a toolkit used for creating interactive 3D experiences running on websites.

== Overview ==
Verge3D enables users to convert content from 3D modelling tools (Blender, 3ds Max, and Maya are currently supported) to view in a web browser. Verge3D was created by the same core group of software engineers that previously created the Blend4Web framework.

== Features ==
Verge3D uses WebGL for rendering. It incorporates components of the Three.js library and exposes its API to application developers.

Puzzles
Application functionality can be added via JavaScript, either by writing code directly or by using Puzzles, Verge3D’s visual programming environment based on Google Blockly. Puzzles is aimed primarily at non-programmers allowing quick creation of interactive scenarios in a drag-and-drop fashion.
App Manager and web publishing
App Manager is a lightweight web-based tool for creating, managing and publishing Verge3D projects, running on top of the local development server. Verge3D Network service integrated in the App Manager allows for publishing Verge3D applications via Amazon S3 and EC2 cloud services.
PBR
For purposes of authoring materials, a glTF 2.0-compliant physically based rendering pipeline is offered alongside the standard shader-based approach. PBR textures can be authored using external texturing software such as Substance Painter for which Verge3D offers the corresponding export preset. Besides the glTF 2.0 model, Verge3D supports physical materials of 3ds Max and Maya (with Autodesk Arnold as reference), and Blender's real-time Eevee materials.
glTF and DCC software integration
Verge3D integrates directly with Blender, 3ds Max, and Maya, enabling users to create 3D geometry, materials, and animations inside the software, then export them in the JSON-based glTF format. The Sneak Peek feature allows for exporting and viewing scenes from the DCC tool environment.
Facebook 3D posts
For Facebook publishing, Verge3D offers a specific GLB export option. The exported GLB files are displayed and can be opened in the App Manager.
Asset compression
Exported files can optionally use LZMA compression, resulting in a reduction in file size of up to 6x.
UI and website layouts
Interface layouts, created using external WYSIWYG editors, can be linked with Puzzles to trigger changes to a 3D scene being rendered in the browser and vice versa.
Animation
Verge3D supports skeletal animation, including animation of bipeds and character rigs, and allows for animation of material parameters. Model parts can also be set up to be dragged by the user.
Physics
The physics module can be linked separately to enable collision detection, dynamically moving objects, support for characters and vehicles, springs, ropes and cloth simulation. As of version 2.11, simple physics simulations can be created and controlled without coding via Puzzles, the visual programming system used by Verge3D.
AR/VR
The 2.10 update added support for WebXR, an in-development open technology designed to enable virtual reality and augmented reality experiences to be displayed in web browsers. It works with both headsets with controllers, like the HTC Vive and Oculus Rift, and those without, like Google Cardboard. AR/VR experiences can enabled via Puzzles or JavaScript.

== Workflow ==
Verge3D's workflow differs substantially from other mainstream WebGL frameworks. Development of a new Verge3D application is usually started from modeling, texturing and animating 3D objects. The models are assembled in the 3D authoring tool. The scene file is then used as a basis for a Verge3D project initialized from the App Manager. An interactive scenario is optionally added using the Puzzles editor. A Verge3D application can be previewed in the web browser at any development stage using the App Manager. The finished web application can be deployed on the Verge3D Network, on Facebook or on the user's website.

== Notable uses ==
NASA's Jet Propulsion Laboratory used Verge3D to create an interactive 3D visualization of the Mars InSight lander. The web application allows for exploring and interacting with the real-time model of the spacecraft, with the possibility to move different parts and unfurl the solar panels.

NASA's older interactive web application Experience Curiosity was ported to Verge3D from Blend4Web. The application makes it possible to operate the rover, control its cameras and the robotic arm and reproduces some of the prominent events of the Mars Science Laboratory mission.

Route 66 Digital's Escape Room used Verge3D and Blender. This interactive short explores how users can navigate 3D spaces and interact with objects without the need for instruction.

== See also ==
- WebGL
- List of WebGL frameworks
- JavaScript framework
- JavaScript library
