= IFrame =

IFrame may refer to:

- <iframe>, an HTML element
- I-frame, a type of video frame in video compression
- "I-Frames", shorthand for the video game term invincibility frames
- iFrame (video format), a digital video format developed by Apple
