= List of WebGL frameworks =

Frameworks are available to create WebGL content quickly and easily without building from the ground up.

Note: The following list mixes WebGL libraries with game engines as well as cloud services without any distinctions.

Name	Scripting	Modeling	Animation	Integrated Audio	Integrated Physics	Cloud-Independent	WebGL Implementation (Version)	WebXR	Import	Export	License	Notes and references
A-Frame	JavaScript, HTML	No	Yes	Yes	No	Yes	Native (2.0)	Yes	glTF, OBJ. More with community components.	No	MIT License	An open-source WebXR framework for building 3D and VR experiences with HTML and Entity component system ecosystem.
Away3D	TypeScript	No	Yes	Yes	Yes	Yes	Flash transpiled (1.0)	No	3ds Max, COLLADA	No	Apache License 2.0	TypeScript/JavaScript adaptation of the Away3D engine built in Flash.
Babylon.js	JavaScript, TypeScript	No	Yes	Yes	Yes	Yes	Native (1.0 and 2.0)	Yes	Babylon, glTF, OBJ, STL	glTF	Apache License 2.0	JavaScript framework for building 3D games with HTML 5 and WebGL.
Clara.io	JavaScript, REST API	Yes	Yes	No	Yes	No	Native (1.0 and 2.0)	Yes	OBJ, FBX, Blender, STL, STP	OBJ, FBX, Blender, STL, Babylon.js, Three.js	Freemium or commercial	Web-based freemium 3D computer graphics software developed by Exocortex, a Canadian software company.
CopperLicht	JavaScript	No	Yes	Yes	Yes	Yes	Native (1.0)	No	No	No	Open source based on zlib	An open source JavaScript library/API for creating games and interactive 3D applications using WebGL, developed by Ambiera.
JanusWeb	JavaScript	No	Yes	Yes	Yes	Yes	Native (1.0)	Yes	OBJ, COLLADA, glTF, FBX, STL, PLY, VRML	HTML, XML, JSON	MIT License	An open-source WebXR client for collaborative 3D world building and exploration.
Kubity	No	No	No	No	Yes	No	.NET transpiled (1.0)	No	No	No	Proprietary	Kubity is an online platform that offers various ways of displaying, exploring and sharing 3D models on Web browser and mobile devices.
LayaAir	ActionScript 3.0, JavaScript, TypeScript	No	Yes	Yes	No	No	Native (1.0), also implements canvas2D	No	FBX	No	Open source (engine), Proprietary (model conversion)	Open-source API for games and multimedia routines modules. Display animation on Web browser and mobile devices.
OSG.JS	JavaScript	No	Yes	Yes	No	Yes	Native (1.0)	Yes	No	No	MIT	Open-source WebGL framework based on OpenSceneGraph concepts.
PlayCanvas	JavaScript	No	Yes	Yes	Yes	Partially	Native (1.0 and 2.0)	Yes	DAE, DXF, FBX, glTF, OBJ	No	MIT (engine), proprietary (cloud-hosted editor)	Open-source 3D game engine alongside a proprietary cloud-hosted creation platform that allows for editing via a browser-based interface.
Sketchfab	JavaScript	No	Yes	Yes	No	No	Native (1.0 and 2.0)	Yes	3DC, 3DS, AC, ABC, OBJ, BVH, Blender, GEO, DAE, DWF, DW, X, DXF, FBX, OGR, GTA, glTF, IGS, MU, CRAFT, KMZ, LAS, LWO, Q3D, MC2OBJ, FLT, IV, OSG, PLY, BSP, MD2, MDL, SHP, STL, TXP, VPK, WRL, VRML	No	Proprietary	A website used to display and share 3D content online.
Three.js	JavaScript	No	Yes	Yes	No	Yes	Native (2.0)	Yes	glTF, USDZ, DRACO, FBX, OBJ, STL, MMD, PRWM, PCD, PDB, LDraw, 3DM, COLLADA, VRML	glTF, USDZ OBJ, PLY, STL, COLLADA	MIT	A cross-browser JavaScript library/API used to create and display animated 3D computer graphics on a Web browser.
Unity	C#	Yes	Yes	Yes	Yes	Yes	.NET transpiled to Wasm (2.0)	Yes	FBX, OBJ, DAE, glTF, STL	No	Proprietary	Offers a WebGL build option since version 5.
Verge3D	JavaScript	Yes	Yes	Yes	Yes	Yes	Native (1.0 and 2.0)	Yes	glTF, USDZ, FBX, OBJ, STL	glTF, USDZ	Proprietary	Artist-friendly WebGL framework with Blender, 3ds Max, and Maya integrations.

== See also ==
- WebGL
- List of game engines
