= VRTO =

International exhibition and professional conference

VRTO Virtual & Augmented Reality World Conference & Expo
- Frequency: Annually
- Locations: Toronto, Canada
- Most recent: 2015
- People: Keram Malicki-Sanchez
- Website: conference.virtualreality.to

VRTO (Virtual Reality Toronto) was founded in 2015 by Keram Malicki-Sánchez as a Meetup group dedicated to virtual reality in Toronto. In June 2016, VRTO launched the VRTO Virtual & Augmented Reality World Conference & Expo, a professional event focused on exploring arts, culture, and science through immersive technologies.

Its inaugural year – held at the Mattamy Centre (better known as Maple Leaf Gardens in Toronto, Canada) – it featured keynotes from University of Toronto Professor Steve Mann, Hollywood film director Brett Leonard – director of The Lawnmower Man, Chief Digital Officer Ana Serrano of the Canadian Film Centre and Phil Lelyveld of USC.

The opening year featured a keynote, town hall and discussion panel around creating a Code of Ethics for Humanistic Augmentation also known as the HACode or The Toronto Code.

In 2016 and 2017 the show was co-produced by Jessy Blaze and Chrissy Aitchison. In 2018 and 2019 it was produced by Stephanie Greenall, Aitchison and Melanie Smith. Longtime collaborator Joshua Miles Joudrie served as a key production consultant.

== VRTO 2016 ==
The conference, in its inaugural year welcomed 800 attendees and 64 speakers from Toronto, Montreal and Los Angeles, and featured over 20 companies working in the development of virtual reality, augmented reality and mixed reality in addition to training sessions dedicated to the creation of 360 video, game development, photogrammetry and WebVR. The conference featured a preview of the FIVARS Festival of International Virtual & Augmented Reality Stories.

The conference featured a workshop titled The Hacker's Guide to the Metaverse that taught programming WebVR using the JanusVR open source platform.

== VRTO 2017 ==
The largest conference dedicated on virtual and augmented reality in Canada, the sophomore year featured 100 speakers and 60 installations. The second year of the VRTO Conference & Expo in 2017 was staged at the Rogers Communications Centre on the Ryerson University campus in downtown Toronto June 24–26 with the theme of "Giants" based on the quote by Sir Isaac Newton: "“If I have seen further than others, it is by standing upon the shoulders of Giants.”

Keynote speakers included Stanford neuroscientist Professor Walter Greenleaf, Ph.D., Graham Smith, David A. Smith, Dr. Sara Diamond - President of OCAD University, Moses Znaimer, Charlie Fink, Dr. Karan Singh and James McCrae - founders of JanusVR and additional live interviews with Steve Mann, and Tim Merel among others.

Several panels, under the banner of "Super Sessions" featured leaders in the field of Virtual & Augmented Reality, health sciences (Dr. Lora Appel, Dr. Tom Overly, Dr. Stephane Bouchard), "Out-of-Home" entertainment (James Jensen of THE VOID, Eyal Kleiner of IMAX, Ed Callway of AMD).

The show was also the launchpad for various products and initiatives, including the Canadian Film Centre's Pulse on VR "living ecosystem" report on the Virtual Reality industry, the Webmoti camera that mitigates social anxiety for children with autism who wish to participate in the classroom, and the Somato Cherry haptic wireless virtual reality controller.

Themed pavilions were co-curated between Malicki-Sanchez and specialists in their respective fields, including Dr. Maria Karam (somatosensory pavilion), Ian Kelso (augmented reality conference track), Isaac Rayment (augmented reality "ARt Gallery") that featured early augmented reality artists Zenka, Daniel Leighton, Alex Mayhew, Dan Goldman, among others.

== VRTO 2018 ==
VRTO 2018 shifted its lens to psychedelia, esoterica, philosophy and phenomenology and how they relate to experiential design, blockchain and Visual Effects. It featured speakers such as Steve "Spaz" Williams (the VFX wizard behind the films The Mask, The Abyss and Jurassic Park), Philip Rosedale (creator of Linden Labs and Second Life), and Brett Leonard, along with 85 other leaders of the VR industry. In its third year, the event added an extra day of conferences, workshops and training. The exhibits featured numerous startup companies in the Ideaboost incubator in partnership with the Canadian Film Centre.

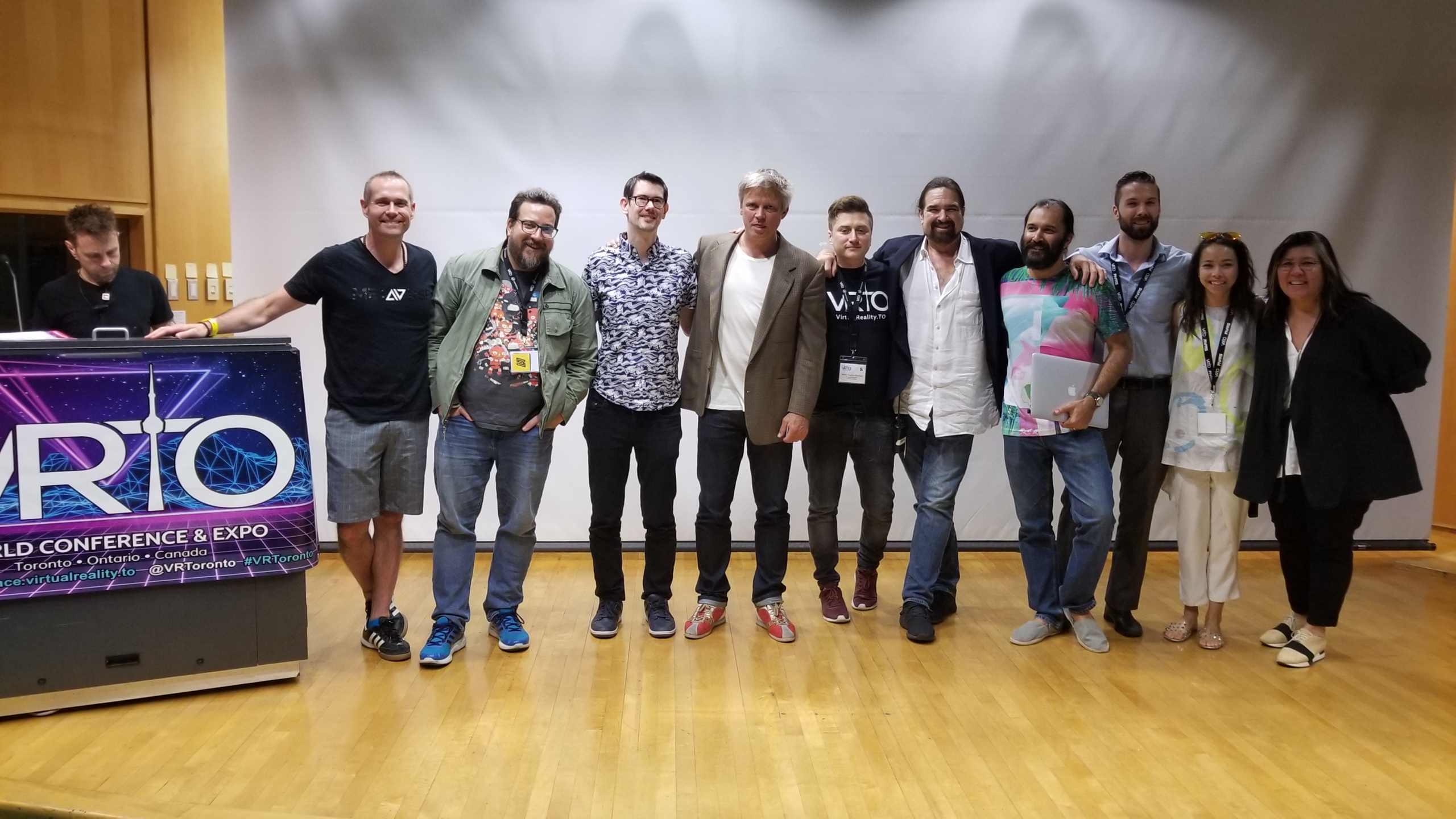

== VRTO 2019 ==
This year, the conference moved to a new location – the Toronto Media Arts Centre. The 2019 conference shifted focus onto a recalibration for the spatialized technologies industry as a whole and added various notable authors to the lineup, including bestselling author Blake Harris "The History of the Future," and Douglas Rushkoff "Team Human." Other notable speakers included Sarah Vicks from Intel Studios and Olivier Asselin from Ubisoft who spoke about volumetric video and VR locomotion, respectively, and Amelia Winger-Bearskin, YouTube phenom syrmor made an in-person appearance, and panels on e-Sports, inclusivity, and a live game show featuring Blair Renaud, and Andre Elijah about game development.

== VRTO 2020 ==
With the social and global effects of the COVID-19 pandemic many conferences were forced to adapt or close down. The VRTO conference moved online for its 5th anniversary, forming a multiplatform, multimodal experience founder Malicki-Sanchez termed "The Flotilla," that had a 30-day run spanning June 6 to July 6. It used a video-streaming conference app, the Mozilla Hubs web VR platform running custom code on the Amazon Web Services cloud, the Discord\platform, and hosted a micro summit on accessibility. The conference also featured contributions from JanusVR and Rochester Institute of Technology. Podcaster Kent Bye wrote a phenomenological journal of his experience and stated that "VRToronto is doing a lot of pioneering work in making their conference more accessible.". The show was co-produced by Stephanie Greenall.

== VRTO 2021 ==
For the second year in a row, and due to the ongoing global COVID-19 pandemic VRTO was hosted wholly in WebXR. "The Flotilla" continued to be a junction to link various virtual world platforms together. In the 2021 event this included links to various virtual world platforms along with the Dyscorpia Project spearheaded by international media artist Marilene Oliver and her fellows at the University of Alberta.

Besides these virtual spaces the conference hosted an extensive seven-day lineup of panels and presentations that included developer talks around game development, virtual production, Esports, accessibility and inclusion, volumetric capture, the arts, medical applications, enterprise, and data analysis, and featured a daily live talkshow hosted from within the virtual world by host Max Noir. The event also featured a live performance workshop that was streamed to attendees and culminated in a live virtual performance operated by Dasha Kittredge and Ari Tarr that was also viewable via VR, on mobile and desktop devices. The show was reviewed positively in VRTrend magazine.

The show was nominated for World of the Year at the 2021 Poly Awards.

== VRTO 2022 ==
VRTO returned to being a live and in-person event in 2022, taking place at OCAD University. The event was produced by Keram Malicki-Sanchez and associate producer Aimee Reynolds. The marketing campaign featured muppets created using GAN-created images with the Midjourney AI platform. Its new tagline was "Where Fresh Ideas Are Born." The 2-day conference featured speakers including Dr. Alexis Morris (OCAD), Lee Vermeulen, who presented how he was using GPT-3 to make NPCs talk inside of his world designs, Dario Laverde HTC Vive presented their Mars home Virtual Production technology, Justin Cathcart (Dark Slope) demonstrated their VR-based television sports series for adolescents, and the lead team of virtual production from VFX studio Pixomondo, who shared secrets behind the creation of Star Trek: Strange New Worlds and Star Trek: Discovery.

The show focused on the way spatial media was reaching critical mass in affecting media creation and featuring talks about live VR theater performance, Hyperreality TV, natural-language Holodecks, and next-gen haptic technology. The event drew over 200 attendees from across North America.

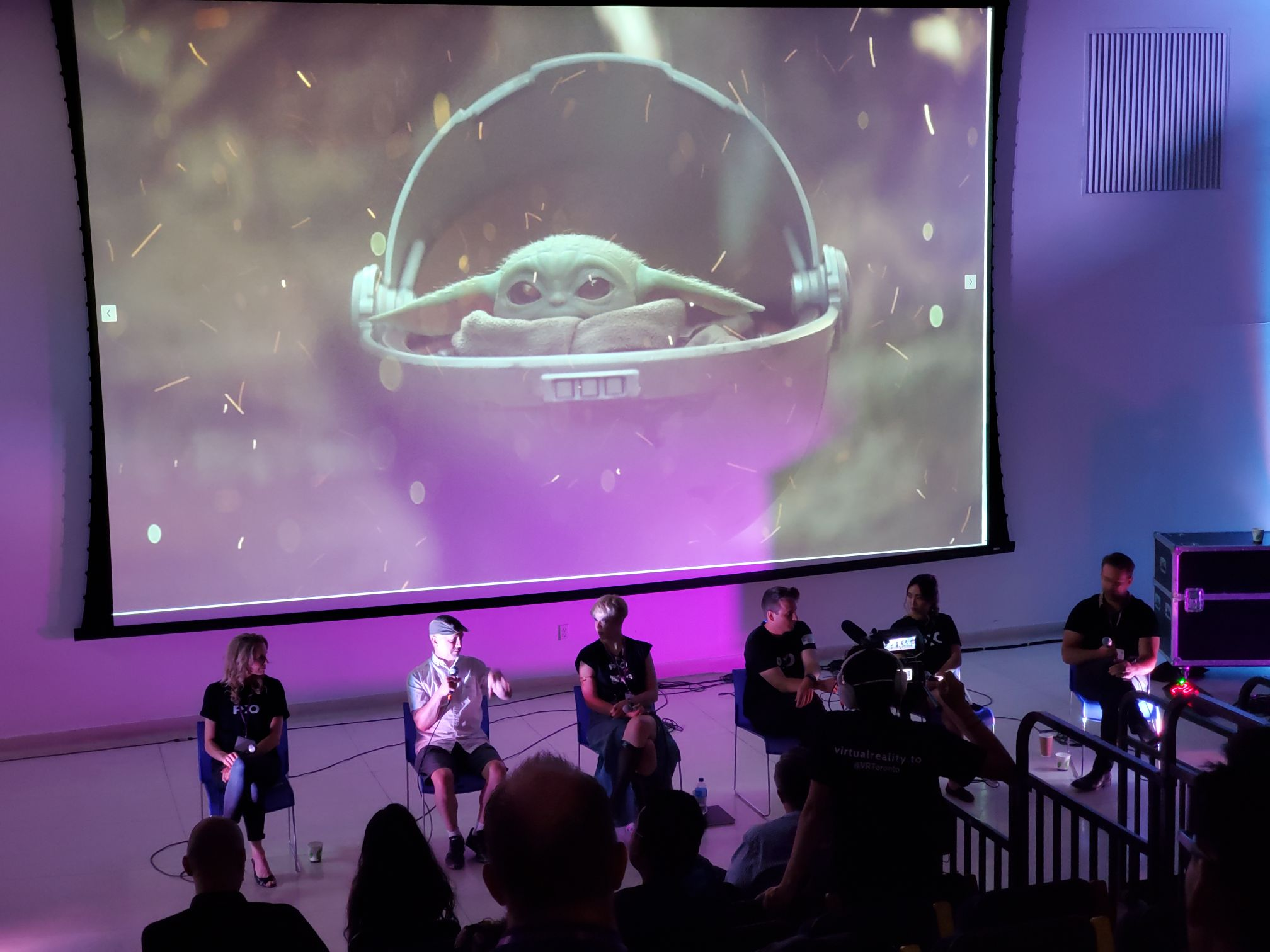
The Pixomondo Toronto Virtual Production and VFX team super session at VRTO 2022

== VRTO 2023 ==
VRTO moved to the OCAD University waterfront location in 2023 and featured over 50 speakers. It included a summit on live virtual reality performers, which was the first time many virtual reality actors from different troupes were together in one place. These actors included Whitton Frank (The Under Presents, Ferryman Collective), Ari Tarr, Mandy Canales, Alex Coulombe, Debbie Deer, Nicole Rigo, and Jake Runeckles. The keynote was delivered by Amanda Watson, who invented the Air Link technology used in the Meta Quest. Other notable attendees included Dr. Thomas A. Furness III, and Kyle Chivers - CEO of BLockade Labs. Panels included discussion on the intersection of game development and AI, and the future of XR in education.

== VRTO 2024 ==
VRTO returned to OCAD University's flagship campus in Toronto, and featured The VOID Curtis Hickman - co-founder of hyperreality VR experience company The VOID, narrative game writer Anne Toole whose lead game writing credits include Horizon Zero Dawn, The Witcher, and Days Gone, and Dave Cardwell - head of 3D & Immersive Labs for Adobe Systems. Topics including workflows for gaussian splatting, "NeRF" (neural radiance fields), gesture control, and development for WebXR. The show was produced by Malicki-Sanchez and Aimee Reynolds.

== VRTO 2025 ==
VRTO produced its 10th year anniversary event, and included the FIVARS festival running simultaneously for the first time since the conference's inaugural year in 2016. The Toronto chapter of the Visual Effects Society presented a panel of experienced VFX producers to talk about spatial media production and generative AI. VRTO was presented with a letter of recognition from Member of Parliament Judy Sgro.
