= Festival of International Virtual & Augmented Reality Stories =

Media festival

Festival of International Virtual & Augmented Reality Stories (FIVARS) is a Canadian media festival for story-driven works using extended reality (XR) and immersive media, including virtual reality, augmented reality, WebXR, live VR performance, projection mapping and spatialized audio. Founded in Toronto in 2015, it has been described as Canada's first dedicated virtual and augmented reality stories festival, the first Canadian festival of its kind, and Canada's original festival dedicated to immersive storytelling. FIVARS has described itself as "the original and longest-running festival wholly dedicated to Virtual and Augmented Reality Stories", while third-party XR coverage has called it one of the longest-running events dedicated to immersive content. FIVARS is produced by Constant Change Media Group, Inc., with its partner event VRTO.

== History ==
FIVARS began in 2015, with preview screenings at the Camp Wavelength music festival on Toronto Island and an inaugural festival held in Toronto in September 2015. Contemporary coverage described the first edition as a virtual reality film festival held at UG3 Live in Toronto.

The festival continued with a second edition in 2016. L'Express described the 2016 festival as presenting Canadian and international interactive works in virtual and augmented reality narrative forms. FIVARS's 2016 festival was also listed in a York University Future Cinema course page as a public event students could attend.

In 2017, the third annual FIVARS festival was held at the House of VR in Toronto. In 2018, the festival was held at the Matador Ballroom, which NOW Magazine reported was reopening for FIVARS from September 14 to 16. The festival's own history states that the 2018 edition included 36 works from 12 countries and that Stephanie Greenall took over as co-producer that year.

In 2019, FIVARS moved to the Toronto Media Arts Centre for its fifth anniversary and listed official selections in passive and interactive immersive-experience categories. The festival also held talks and panels at the Toronto Media Arts Centre.

During the COVID-19 pandemic, FIVARS moved part of its programming online. In 2020, Voices of VR reported that Malicki-Sanchez and WebXR developer James Baicoianu used JanusXR code to create a platform for presenting 360-degree video through the web. The festival's history states that its 2020 online festival included 39 selections from 16 countries and was produced by Malicki-Sanchez and Greenall.

In 2021, FIVARS introduced a dual-event structure with FIVARS in FEB and FIVARS in FALL. The fall 2021 edition used a hybrid format, with an in-person component in West Hollywood from October 15 to 17 and an online WebXR component from October 22 to November 2.

In 2022, FIVARS held hybrid programming with pop-up viewing locations in Los Angeles and Toronto. The fall 2022 edition was listed by blogTO as the festival's tenth edition, with an in-person component at Stackt - an outdoor arts park built from shipping containers in Toronto and online programming.

The 2023 festival was presented as a hybrid exhibition of 65 immersive stories, with an in-person Toronto component and an online component. The FIVARS Online Festival was later listed among the Innovator of the Year nominees for the 2024 Poly Awards. FIVARS stated that the nominees for that recognition were producer and designer Keram Malicki-Sanchez and developer James Baicoianu.

The 2024 edition was listed as FIVARS 2024 (Toronto + Online), with an in-person Toronto event from October 3 to 8 and an online component beginning October 10. The festival also published a 2024 official selections list covering virtual reality, augmented reality, spherical video, spatial web and related immersive formats.

In 2025, FIVARS and VRTO were held together at OCAD University. The 2026 edition is scheduled for June 15 to 19, 2026, at OCAD University in Toronto, with OCAD University as presenting sponsor and first-time venue host.

FIVARS has featured official selections from more than forty countries across six continents.

== Organization ==
FIVARS was founded in 2015 by Keram Malicki-Sánchez. Joseph Ellsworth was the festival's original technical director and helped operate FIVARS during its early years. Malicki-Sánchez remains executive director and festival director.

Jessy Blaze joined Malicki-Sánchez as co-producer in 2016 and served until Stephanie Greenall took over the role in 2018. Greenall served as co-producer and associate producer from 2018 to 2022. Aimee Reynolds took over from Greenall in 2022 and has served as associate producer of FIVARS and VRTO since 2022.

== Immersive Media Awards ==
FIVARS presents People's Choice awards for interactive works and immersive video or passive immersive works. Juried award categories have included the Grand Jury Prize, Impact Award, Technical Achievement, Excellence in Experience Design, Excellence in Visual Design, Excellence in Sound Design, and Outstanding Performance.

=== 2015 ===
On Monday, September 21, the festival announced People's Choice awards for two categories at the Cadillac Lounge, a music venue and restaurant in Toronto.

People's Choice

- Best Interactive Experience: Apollo 11
- Best Immersive Video: SONAR

=== 2016 ===
People's Choice

- Best Interactive Experience: Pearl (Patrick Osborne)
- Best Immersive Video: Help (Justin Lin)

Juried

- Grand Jury Award: Real (Connor Hair and Alex Meader)

=== 2017 ===
People's Choice

- Best Interactive: Alteration
- Best Immersive (Passive): Guardian of the Guge Kingdom

Juried

- Impact Award: Priya's Shakti / Priya's Mirror (Dan Goldman)
- Grand Jury Prize: Manifest 99

=== 2018 ===
People's Choice

- Best Interactive: Museum of Symmetry (Paloma Dawkins)
- Best Immersive (Passive): Going Home (David Beier)

Juried

- Impact Award: The Hidden (Annie Lukowski, BJ Schwartz)
- Grand Jury Prize: Battlescar (Nico Casavecchia, Martin Allais)

=== 2019 ===
People's Choice

- Best Interactive: After Dan Graham (David Han/Friend Generator)
- Best Immersive (Passive): 2nd Step (Joerg Courtial)

Juried

- Technical Achievement: tx-reverse
- Excellence in Experience Design: Battlescar (Nico Casavecchia, Martin Allais)
- Excellence in Sound Design: Unheard (Zhechuan Zhang)
- Excellence in Visual Design: Ex Anima (Pierre Zandrowicz)
- Impact Award: State Power (Jeff Stanzler)
- Grand Jury Prize: The Industry (Mirka Duijn)

=== 2020 ===
People's Choice

- Best Interactive: Gravity VR (Fabito Rychter, Amir Admoni)
- Best Immersive (Passive): Warsaw Rising (Tomasz Dobosz)

Juried

- Technical Achievement: The Cosmic Laughter of Cucci Binaca (Jonathan Sims)
- Excellence in Experience Design: Sleeping Eyes (Sojung Bahng, Sungeun Lee)
- Excellence in Sound Design: Symphony of Noise VR (Michaela Pnacekova)
- Excellence in Visual Design: Hominidae (Brian Andrews)
- Impact Award: Indirect Actions (Maranatha Hay)
- Grand Jury Prize: Minimum Mass (Raqi Syed, Areito Echevarria)

=== 2021 ===
FIVARS in FEB – People's Choice

- Best Interactive: CLAWS (created by Evan Neiden; directed by John Ertman)
- Best Immersive (Passive): Inside COVID 19 (Gary Yost, Adam Loften)

FIVARS in FALL – People's Choice

- Best Interactive: Samsara (director: Hsin-Chien Huang)
- Best Immersive (Passive): The Invasion of Normandy Omaha Beach (director: Uli Futschik)

Juried

- Technical Achievement: Dark Threads (director: Jonathon Corbiere)
- Excellence in Experience Design: Andy's World (director: Liquan Liu)
- Excellence in Sound Design: Symphony (director: Igor Cortadellas)
- Excellence in Visual Design: Mind VR Exploration (director: Deng Zuyun)
- Outstanding Performance: Lori Kovachevich, Lena's Journey (director: Wes Evans)
- Impact Award: Om Devi: Sheroes Revolution (director: Claudio Casale)
- Grand Jury Prize: Montegelato (director: Davide Rapp)

=== 2022 ===
FIVARS in FEB – People's Choice

- Best Interactive: Severance Theory: Welcome to Respite (Lyndsie Scoggin, United States)
- Best Immersive (Passive): Beescapes (Alan Nguyen, Australia)

FIVARS in FALL – People's Choice

- Best Interactive: Namuanki (Kevin Mack, United States)
- Best Immersive (Passive): Reimagined Vol. 1: Nyssa (Julie Cavaliere, United States)

Juried (Whole Year)

- Technical Achievement: Namuanki (Kevin Mack, United States)
- Excellence in Experience Design: Unframed: Hand Puppets, Paul Klee (Martin Charrière, Switzerland)
- Excellence in Visual Design: The Last Dance (Toshiaki Hanzaki, Japan)
- Excellence in Sound Design: Kingdom of Plants with David Attenborough (Iona McEwan, UK and USA)
- Outstanding Performance: Ari Tarr, OffRail (Ari Tarr, United States)
- Impact Award: Tearless (Gina Kim, South Korea)
- Grand Jury Prize: Klaxon. My dear sweet Friend (Nikita Shokhov, United States)

=== 2023 ===
People's Choice

- Best Interactive: PULSAR
- Best Immersive (Passive): Behind the Dish

Juried

- Technical Achievement: VFC
- Excellence in Experience Design: Broken Spectre
- Excellence in Visual Design: Night Creatures
- Excellence in Sound Design: VFC
- Outstanding Performance: Origins
- Impact Award: LOU
- Grand Jury Prize: Stay Alive, My Son

=== 2024 ===
People's Choice

- Best Interactive: Astra (Eliza McNitt)
- Best Immersive (Passive): Ganga (director: Carol Liu)

Juried

- Technical Achievement: The Tent (director: Rory Mitchell)
- Excellence in Experience Design: Ghosts in the Machine: The Old Zoo (director: Koryn Wicks)
- Excellence in Visual Design: Trans-composition (director: Shiuan Yan)
- Excellence in Sound Design: A Vocal Landscape
- Outstanding Performance: Rowan Wood, Liminal
- Impact Award: Coffin Room (directors: Kay Kwan, Lam Nhi Le)
- Grand Jury Prize: A Vocal Landscape (directors: Anne Jeppesen, Omid Zarei)
