= Google Chrome Experiments =

Online showroom of web browser based experiments

Chrome Experiments
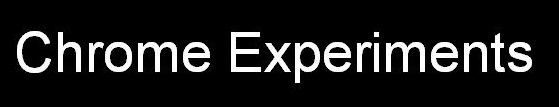

- Screenshot Screenshot of Chrome Experiments website
- Company type: Nonprofit
- Website type: Showcase of web technology
- Owner: Google Inc.
- Creator: Google Inc.
- Website: www.chromeexperiments.com
- Commercial: No
- Launched: March 1, 2009; 17 years ago
- Current status: Active

Google Chrome Experiments is an online showroom of web browser-based experiments, interactive programs, and artistic projects. Launched on March 1, 2009, Google Chrome Experiments is an official Google website that was originally meant to test the limits of JavaScript and the Google Chrome browser's performance and abilities. As the project progressed, it took on the role of showcasing and experimenting with the latest open-source web-based technologies, such as JavaScript, HTML, WebGL, Canvas, SVG, and CSS. All the projects on Chrome Experiments are user-submitted and are made using open-source technologies. As of 2024, the website continues to host a growing number of experiments, featuring over 1,500 projects.

== History ==
Google's Chrome Experiments was launched in March 2009 with 19 experiments. The main reason for its inception was to demonstrate and test the abilities of JavaScript and Google's V8 JavaScript engine. Over time, it also started featuring other open-source web-based technologies such as HTML, Scalable Vector Graphics (SVG), WebGL, Web Audio, and the Canvas element. The focus of the project throughout has been on open-source technology and thus does not feature proprietary software such as Adobe Flash. The website is steadily gaining popularity along with the number of featured experiments. The number of experiments increased to 50 by August 2009, to 100 by July 2010, and to 500 by September 2012. As of 2024, the number of experiments on the website exceeds 1,500.

The earliest projects featured on the site were mainly visualizations, interactive toys, and simple online games. According to Google's official blog, the earliest contributors were artists and programmers like Casey Reas, Ricardo Cabello (Mr.doob), Ryan Alexander, Joshua T. Nimoy, and Karsten Schmidt (Toxi). Since its inception and launch, Chrome Experiments has featured only user-submitted projects on their site, with a few exceptions of projects submitted by Google's teams. However, these submissions are first curated by the Chrome Experiments team and then posted on the site for reviews and comments. The user-submitted projects are not hosted on the Google site; Google Chrome Experiments only posts a verified link to the developer's website.

== Major technologies used ==
Google Chrome Experiments was originally started to demonstrate the usability of JavaScript alone, but over time it has now become a platform to showcase capabilities of other open-source web-based technologies such as WebGL, HTML, SVG, and the Canvas element.

=== JavaScript ===
JavaScript is a scripting language that is mainly used for creating dynamic website pages and enhanced user interfaces for web browsers. Highly influenced by programming languages such as C, Java, Self, and Scheme, JavaScript supports object-oriented, functional, and imperative programming styles. Even though its name has Java in it, it is an entirely different language from Java. JavaScript is the main area of focus on Google Chrome Experiments, so nearly all of the experiments showcased on the site use JavaScript in some form or another.

=== HTML ===
Hypertext Markup Language, or HTML, is the most used markup language for displaying web pages and is the backbone language for the Internet itself. Since HTML5, it facilitates playing of audio and video elements in the browser itself, usage of Scalable Vector Graphics (SVG), and with the help of JavaScript or CSS3, programmers can even design animations.

All Google Chrome experiments are browser-based and nearly all of the paint and design tools on the site, along with some games, utilize HTML and 2-D Canvas elements.

=== Cascading Style Sheets ===
Cascading Style Sheets (CSS) is a style sheet language that is used to format the structure and look of a webpage written in markup languages such as HTML and XHTML. Along with markup languages, it can also be used to format XML documents. CSS allows developers to move formatting attributes such as font color, font style, font size, background color, borders, section sizes, and other elements to a single separate file, resulting in much simpler code and more flexible handling of final rendering. Because of this feature, CSS is heavily used in nearly all Chrome experiments.

=== WebGL ===
WebGL (Web Graphics Library) is a JavaScript API used for rendering 3-D and 2-D graphics and animations in the web browser itself without any additional plugin. The web browser should be compatible with the API. WebGL is an open-source API that is based on Open Graphics Library Embedded Systems (OpenGL ES) and draws inspiration from the Canvas 3-D element. WebGL is currently supported by Google Chrome and Mozilla Firefox, along with limited support by Safari and Opera. Internet Explorer, however, has no inbuilt support for WebGL until now, but a user can view WebGL content on IE using additional browser plugins.

Utilized by 529 experiments out of 1,127, WebGL is one of the most commonly used technologies on the site. The technology has also gained active use in famous and useful online apps such as Google Maps, and Zygote Body (formerly Google Body).

=== Web Audio ===
Web Audio is the high-level JavaScript API used for processing and playback of audio content on the browser itself, without any additional plugins. All experiments on the Google Chrome Experiment site are designed to be interactive and attractive, thus Web Audio is an integral part of most of these projects.

== Mobile ==
On February 7, 2012, Google launched its first beta release of Chrome for mobile, and on June 27, 2012, Google added a new section on the Google Chrome Experiment website dedicated to only mobile-based applications.

In 2013, Google Chrome Racer (a "slot car race") debuted at the Google I/O developer conference, developed by Google Creative Lab New York, builds by Active Theory LA, sound effects and soundtrack code by Plan8 Sweden and 14islands, theme music by Giorgio Moroder, and backend by PA Consulting London.

In 2024, Google continues to update Chrome Experiments with new categories and cutting-edge projects. Recent additions include VR and AR experiments, as well as AI-powered interactive experiences. The platform remains a showcase for innovative uses of web technologies, demonstrating the potential of modern browsers and the web as a creative medium.

== See also ==
- GeoGuessr
