= LayaBox =

Chinese-developed freeware framework

LayaAir
- Original author: Xie ChengHong (CEO)
- Developers: Souyou Network Technology Beijing Co., Ltd.
- Release: May 20, 2016; 10 years ago
Stable release
- LayaAir: 3.1 / June 30, 2023; 3 years ago
- LayaAir: 3.1.0 / November 29, 2023; 2 years ago
- Written in: English
- Operating system: Windows
- Available in: English, Chinese
- Type: Game engine
- License: Freeware
- Website: layaair.com

LayaBox (Souyou Network Technology Beijing Co., Ltd.), also known as Laya, is a Chinese-developed freeware framework, which includes a web-based game engine named LayaAir, targeting mobile and web platforms, as well as online publishing and digital distribution services. It was first announced at the Global Mobile Game Confederation conference in April 2015. It offers a feature set for developing multi-platform games.

Currently, a hundred games use Laya engine solutions. The LayaPublish module is available to publish games made with LayaBox to various platforms.

== History ==
Created in 2014 by Xie ChengHong, LayaBox was initially focused on high-performance transcompiling of Flash-based games coded in ActionScript 3.0 to web-based games via JavaScript and WebGL.

== LayaAir 1.0 ==
During the International Game Developers Conference held in November 2015, Xie ChengHong announced that a new 3D engine was in development. On 30 June 2016, LayaAir 1.0 was published on its official website, with 3D and VR support features. It comes equipped with UI editor functionality and supports one-time development for full platform release.

== LayaAir 3.0（2023） ==
LayaAir 3.0 was released in June 2023.

== Technology and features ==
The "Layabox Product Family" is a components suite solution designed to implement web/mobile game publishing, translating contents, profit monetization, 3rd party API, and online distribution.

Layabox sequence diagram features overview

=== LayaFlash ===
LayaFlash is a source-to-source compiler that runs as a back end to the LLVM compiler, making it the most suitable for ActionScript 3.0 programmers to release on web platform. It is also fully compatible with Flash IDEs such as FlashBuilder, FDT, FlashDevelop, or LayaAir IDE.

=== LayaAir ===
LayaAir is a dedicated open-source API for games and multimedia routines modules. It can be integrated with different ECMAScript standard language (ActionScript 3.0, JavaScript and TypeScript).

The LayaAir engine use its own 3D data format file. To handle importation of assets data from 3D graphics software, LayaBox provides a tools converter from FBX files. Also, the Unity plugin is available to convert the Unity GameObject class into LayaModel files (*.lm).

The last core libraries released support:

- UI library primitives with the most common GUI elements in game scene. (both <canvas> tag and WebGL mode support).
- 2D skeletal animation by interpolation with timeline, GPU skinning for 3D.
- 2D/3D particle system.
- VR view mode.
- Audio libraries and sound controller: (wrap OpenAL for mobile and HTML audio for web browser).
- Composite, blend, and basic filters operation: <canvas>/sprite.
- Various event-driven programming with event Bubbling and Capturing.
- Compatibility with some additional frameworks: Starling, MornUI

=== LayaPlayer ===
Written in C and C++, LayaPlayer (codenamed Conch) is a runtime accelerator for Android and iOS to execute web-based games with low memory footprints, low CPU consumption, logic rendering with dual core running, GPU acceleration, video memory intelligent management, and extremely optimized rendering flow with high FPS results.

It supports Canvas, WebGL, and DOM-type engines. Web-based applications, released with LayaPlayer, run mobile apps at near-native speeds.

It is possible to call native library functions from web-based JavaScript code.

=== LayaPublish ===
Relating to publication services, LayaPublish helps mainstream companies acquire internet traffic. Available in rich web application form, it also gives an opportunity for developers to spread their game visibility .

=== LayaStore ===
LayaStore is an embedded program that can run directly into native applications; it gives access to a full list of web games from the LayaBox store. Introduced as a lightweight (less than 20 kilobytes) add-on component help monetization for developers. It can generate revenue on either a microtransaction or a number-of-mobile-installations basis.

=== LayaOpen ===
LayaOpen is a platform exchange that offers revenue management and leaderboard statistics for developers and channel distributors, who can get product information and feedback on User data, Social sharing / analytics, and monthly active users.

== Distribution ==
A Developers Account lets users connect their games across distribution channels. Mobile marketing technology is the main target audiences.

non-exhaustive list of Layabox channels distribution

2015

- Tencent QQ Browser – QQ空间玩吧
- Tencent Qzone – QQ浏览器
- Baidu Browser – 百度浏览器
- Cheetah Mobile Browser – 猎豹浏览器
- Sina Weibo – 新浪微博
- China Telecom – 中国电信

== Reception ==
=== Games using the Laya solutions ===
non-exhaustive list of game using Laya engine

2015

- Go Your Majesty (上吧主公)
- Hunter Blade 2 (猎刃2)
- Sword master (傲剑) (by aojian趣游)
- Westward Journey Online (醉西游) (MMORPG by 4399游戏)
- Dragon Shout (龙吟三国) (2.5D RPG by KINGNET)
- TiānTiān LièRén (天天猎人) (by Hagoot)
- SānGuó Zhì Luàn Guà (三国志乱挂) (by Hagoot)
- Three Kingdoms: Hong (轰三国)
- The Heroes Conquest (英雄争霸)
- Gate of Warfare (战争之门)
- The Magic Card Fantacy (魔卡幻想)
- Cute Three Kingdoms (萌挂三国)
- The Three Kingdoms: Take the Tower (夺塔三国)
- I Love My Family (我爱我家)
- Bear on Way (熊来啦)
- Journey to the West Rush (西游快跑)
- Hey Vixen! (哟狐狸精)
- Mini Hunters (迷你猎人)

=== Awards and recognition ===
- 2015 Game Industry Contribution Award – HTML5 game (2015年HTML5游戏产业贡献奖)
- H5 – 2015 Best engine award (Layabox荣膺"2015年度最佳引擎奖")

== See also ==
- Rich web application
- Mochi Media
- Shumway
