= Kubity =

Cloud-based 3D communication tool

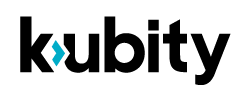
- Developer: SPK Technology
- Operating system: Android, iOS, Windows, macOS, Linux
- Website: www.kubity.com

Kubity is a cloud-based 3D communication tool that works on desktop computers, the web, smartphones, tablets, augmented reality gear, and virtual reality glasses. Kubity is powered by several proprietary 3D processing engines including "Paragone" and "Etna" that prepare the 3D file for transfer over mobile devices.

Kubity has practical applications for architecture, interior design, engineering, product design, film, and video games among others. The majority of its users create 3D models using SketchUp or Autodesk Revit software.

Kubity products include the Kubity web app and Kubity Go (a mobile application for iOS and Android).

Kubity is compatible across many platforms, devices and operating systems including: iOS, Android, Firefox, Chrome, Windows, MacOS, and Linux.

== History ==
Kubity was created by SPK Technology (ex Kubity S.A.S.), a Paris-based software company specializing in automatic 3D data optimization and visualization. Founded in 2012 by a group of software engineers and an urban projects developer, they united around a simple idea: create a way for anyone, anywhere to simply and intuitively explore 3D models on smartphones and computers.

In order to bring architects, engineers and designers together with their clients around a 3D model, it was essential to develop an interactive platform that supported multiple desktop and mobile devices for instantaneous and fluid 3D navigation. With specifications in place, 15 engineers fused together several technologies: 3D design, data compression, decimation and rendering optimization, web and mobile transfer, and virtual reality headset integration.

In January 2014, the first public Kubity prototype (1.0 Amethyst) was launched to a small group of beta testers with a plug-in that allowed users to import 3D models from SketchUp to their browser. A global release was announced in April 2014 at the SketchUp Basecamp in Vail, Colorado.

In May 2015, Kubity launched a web application that worked using WebGL technology (2.0 Citrine). For the first time, users were able to drag and drop any SketchUp file in a web browser without having to install a plug-in.

In December 2015, Kubity launched a mobile application on the App Store for iPhone, iPod, and iPad as well as on Google Play for Android devices (3.0 Druzy).

In November 2016, Kubity launched support for Oculus Rift and HTC Vive (4.0 Emerald).

Beginning in November 2017, Kubity launched a full suite rollout of mobile applications over six months that included Kubity AR for augmented reality, Kubity VR for virtual reality, and Kubity Mirror for remote presentations and screen mirroring (5.0 Feldspar).

In September 2018, a one-click plugin for SketchUp and Revit (Kubity PRO), along with a mobile-first revamp of Kubity Go was launched, allowing PRO-to-Go device pairing for automatic mobile sync (6.0 Gypsum).

In early 2019, the Kubity Go application was updated to include fully integrated AR, VR, and screen mirroring functionalities, killing off the dedicated companion apps Kubity AR, Kubity VR and Kubity Mirror in the process (7.0 Heliotrope).

In January 2020, support for the Kubity PRO plugin for SketchUp and Revit was migrated to a SketchUp-only web app.

== Technology ==
Kubity is powered by a proprietary 3D crystallization engine known as "Paragone"; a technology developed by SPK Technology. Paragone takes constrained information from a 3D file and runs it through the "BlockWave" algorithm (US Patent 10,482.629), also developed by SPK Technology.

BlockWave is a multiphase optimization algorithm that combines 3D design, data compression, decimation and rendering optimization, web and mobile transfer, and mixed reality headset integration to create a crystallized universal format of the original file.

One phase of the BlockWave algorithm is based on the quadric-based polygonal surface simplification algorithm, performed using predefined heuristics, and is associated with a plurality of simplified versions of the 3D model, each version being associated with a predefined level of detail adapted to the user specific end device. BlockWave extracts data content, geometry and textures, then sets quadrics for each top of the original 3D model, and identifies pairs of adjacent tops linked by vertices. The algorithm uses a local collapsing operator and a top-plan error metric to obtain a fixed number of faces or a maximum defined error; 3D meshing is simplified by replacing two points with one, then deleting the degrading faces and updating adjacent relations. Once decimation is completed, texture optimization is set using texture target parameters allowing maximized GPU memory to improve computing time. With texture encoding completed, the crystallized universal 3D file can now be easily opened on any user-specific end device and played across most digital devices with real-time rendering.

== Features ==
=== 3D Crystallization ===
A user converts (or crystallizes) a 3D file by exporting it with the Kubity web app. Crystallization adds features like AR/VR and cinematic fly-through tour as well as assigns the model a dedicated QR code.

=== Automatic Mobile Sync ===
When a 3D model is exported, it is automatically synced to Kubity Go on the user's mobile device. From there, it can be accessed, explored, and shared with others with or without an internet connection.

=== Security and Management ===
User models can be managed all in one place on Kubity Go or in a browser from their account. Models can be renamed, password-protected, shared, and played.

=== Augmented Reality ===
Developed using Apple ARKit and Google ARCore technology, Kubity Go's augmented reality feature maps the environment in a room detecting horizontal planes like tables and floors to track and place 3D objects. By blending digital objects and information with the environment, Kubity allows users to interact with 3D models in true augmented reality.

Built-in communication features allows users to instantly share 3D models with anyone over text, email, social media, or direct device-to-device with a QR Code.

Platform Support

AR supports devices running iOS11 including: iPhone SE, iPhone 6s, iPhone 6s Plus, iPhone 7, iPhone 7 Plus, iPhone 8, iPhone X, all iPad Pro models, and iPad (2017).

AR for Android requires Android 7.0 or later and access to the Google Play Store.

=== Virtual Reality ===
VR allows users to explore SketchUp models and Revit projects on-the-go right from a mobile device using Oculus Go, Google Cardboard, Samsung Gear VR, or the glasses-free Magic Window feature.

Kubity's virtual reality feature is compatible with Oculus Go, Google Cardboard viewers and other cardboard compatible devices including clip-on style VR glasses like Homido Mini, as well as the mobile virtual reality headset, Samsung Gear VR.

Samsung Gear VR supports: Galaxy S6, Galaxy S6 Edge, Galaxy S6 Edge+, Samsung Galaxy Note 5, Galaxy S7, Galaxy S7 Edge, Galaxy S8, Galaxy S8+, Samsung Galaxy Note Fan Edition, Samsung Galaxy Note 8, Samsung Galaxy A8/A8+ (2018), and Samsung Galaxy S9/Galaxy S9+.

=== Screen Mirroring ===
Screen mirroring allows a user to sync the sender device to a receiver on a webpage, then control from the sender device to give a remote presentation of the 3D model.

Devices are easily synced by entering a six-digit number displayed on the receiving computer.

== Platform support ==
On iOS, the Kubity application is compatible with devices running on the version 9.0 or higher. On Android, Kubity is compatible with devices running on the version 4.4 “Kit Kat” or higher.

The web version of Kubity applications currently support web browsers compatible with WebGL2 : Mozilla Firefox and Google Chrome.

AR is compatible with devices running iOS11 including: iPhone SE, iPhone 6s, iPhone 6s Plus, iPhone 7, iPhone 7 Plus, iPhone 8, iPhone X, all iPad Pro models, and iPad (2017), and Android devices. Requires Android 7.0 or later and access to the Google Play Store.

VR is compatible with Google Cardboard viewers and other cardboard compatible devices including clip-on style VR glasses like Homido Mini, as well as the Samsung Gear VR and Oculus Go.

Samsung Gear VR supports: Galaxy S6, Galaxy S6 Edge, Galaxy S6 Edge+, Samsung Galaxy Note 5, Galaxy S7, Galaxy S7 Edge, Galaxy S8, Galaxy S8+, Samsung Galaxy Note Fan Edition, Samsung Galaxy Note 8, Samsung Galaxy A8/A8+ (2018) and Samsung Galaxy S9/Galaxy S9+.

== See also ==
- SketchUp
- Autodesk Revit
- Topology optimization
- Data compression
- 3D rendering
- Augmented reality
- Mixed reality
- Virtual reality
