= South by Southwest (disambiguation) =

South by Southwest is an annual music and film festival in Austin, Texas, United States.

South by Southwest may also refer to:

== Spinoff events ==
- SXSW V2V, Las Vegas, US (2013–2015)
- SXSW London, England (since 2025)

== Television ==
- "South By Southwest", a 2001 episode of V.I.P.
- "South By Southwest", a 2009 episode in NCIS season 6
- Murder, She Wrote: South By Southwest, a 1997 TV movie of Murder, She Wrote

== See also ==
- South-southwest, southwest by south, in Points of the compass
