= Cl3ver =

Software service

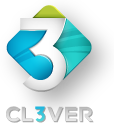
- Website type: Real time 3D engine
- Available in: English
- Website: www.cl3ver.com
- Commercial: Yes
- Registration: Free
- Launched: July 2013
- Current status: Active

Cl3ver is a SaaS to edit and display 3D content online. The company is based in Barcelona and uses the WebGL technology to display 3D models on any webpage on desktop and mobile devices. In July 2012 Cl3ver enters in Wayra the startup accelerator owned by Telefónica.

== Service ==
Cl3ver is a real time 3D engine that allow to publish 3D content on a website. 3D models created with a 3D modeling software are imported in an editor where the scene is created with lighting and cameras. Through an API it is possible to gives animation to the scene and finally embed it via Iframe. The viewer enable the scene to be available online.

== Technology ==
The Cl3ver 3D viewer use the WebGL JavaScript API to display 3D scenes and is built using the open-source OSG.JS JavaScript library. This allows the display of interactive 3D scenes on webpages without the need of third-party plugins if the browser supports WebGL. On browsers that don't support the WebGL technology, the Cl3ver viewer uses a 2D fallback displaying in HTML5. For browsers that are provided with the Adobe Flash Player plugin the scene runs in Flash 3D.

== History ==
Cl3ver, initially called Bevelity, was founded in October 2011 by business manager Viktor Nordstrom and the Software developer Daniel Iborra. In July 2012 the startup is selected to enter Wayra the startup accelerator owned by Telefónica. In May 2013 Cl3ver closes an $800,000 seed round led by Telefónica and La Caixa Capital Risc. In August 2013 Cl3ver is finalist at SXSW V2V competition in the category "Innovative World Technology". In November 2017, academy award winners Chaos Group, invested €2 million in CL3VER In May 2017 Co-founder Viktor Nordstrom left the company and Daniel Iborra became the CEO. In 2019 the company filled for bankruptcy.
