= CopperLicht =

Open-source JavaScript library for creating games and interactive 3D applications

- Developer: Ambiera
- Final release: 1.12 / May 2, 2016; 9 years ago
- Written in: JavaScript
- Type: JavaScript library
- License: based on zlib
- Website: ambiera.com/copperlicht/

CopperLicht is an open-source JavaScript library for creating games and interactive 3D applications using WebGL, developed by Ambiera. The aim of the library is to provide an API for making it easier developing 3D content for the web. It is supposed to be used together with its commercial 3D world editor CopperCube, but it can also be used without.

== History ==
In February 2010, Ambiera introduced CopperLicht and showcased it by providing a demo website, showing a Quake III Arena level rendered in real time in the browser window. The library was originally intended to be used as a WebGL backend for the CopperCube editor, but then the developers decided to make the library free to be used by the public. In November 2014, CopperLicht was made free and open source, based on a zlib style license.

== Features ==
CopperLicht includes the following features:

- 3D rendering based on a hierarchical scene graph
- Pre-created materials and shaders, including pre-calculated lightmap support
- Skeletal animation
- Built-in collision detection and simple Physics engine
- Dynamic light support
- System to create and use custom shaders and materials based on the OpenGL Shading Language (GLSL)
- Impostors like Billboards and Skyboxes
- Paths and Splines
- Behavior and Action system
- Texture animation
- Vertex color support
- Integrated 2D font and 2D primitives rendering system
- Automatic redraw reduction system

== See also ==
- List of WebGL frameworks
- WebGL
- Canvas element
- CopperCube
