= The Museum of All Things =

2025 video game

- Developer: Bread Cat Games
- Platforms: Windows, Macintosh, Linux, Meta Quest
- Release: 25 March 2025
- Genre: Educational
- Mode: Single-player

The Museum of All Things is a 2025 video game developed by independent developer Bread Cat Games. It is an educational video game in which players browse imagery and information sourced from Wikipedia and Wikimedia Commons in a procedurally-generated virtual museum. Upon release, The Museum of All Things received praise for its virtual imitation of the activity of browsing the site.

== Gameplay ==
Gameplay screenshot

Players navigate a procedurally generated virtual museum space, with links between topics connected with stairs and corridors. The imagery and text of exhibits are sourced from Wikimedia Commons pictures and Wikipedia articles, requiring an online connection to the Wikipedia API to source information. Players navigate the museum by following signs to connected topics. Exhibits are grouped together by topics, including space, culture, people and technology. A search function in a custom room allows players to manually search for a room based on a specific article. The game allows players to view the corresponding articles online using a link in the pause menu.

== Development and release ==
The Museum of All Things was developed by Bread Cat Games, the studio of independent developer Maya Claire. Claire stated that the game was designed in Godot from November 2024, and was inspired by a childhood love of museums and educational videos. Claire used procedural generation to create unique layouts for the exhibits, estimating the entire size of the museum's layout would comprise the size of Philadelphia. The game was released on itch.io under the MIT License for Microsoft Windows, Macintosh and Linux, and was adapted using OpenXR for Meta Quest virtual reality headsets.

== Reception ==
Describing The Museum of All Things as a "charmingly unusual way" to browse Wikipedia, Rock Paper Shotgun considered the game's vast size was an "insidiously graceful spectacle of its own self-assembly". Games Hub found the game "compelling and informative", writing that it immersively allowed players to "search for new knowledge in a way that's arguably more engaging" than browsing the site. Digital Trends wrote that the game was a "clever use of interactive media that puts into perspective just how much information we have on demand", feeling that it captured the "quintessential experience" of "getting lost in the rabbit hole".
