= OSG.JS =

- Original author: Cédric Pinson
- Final release: 0.2.9 / February 13, 2018; 8 years ago
- Written in: JavaScript
- Type: WebGL framework
- Website: github.com/cedricpinson/osgjs
- Repository: github.com/cedricpinson/osgjs

OSG.JS is a WebGL framework based on OpenSceneGraph concepts. It allows an individual to use an “OpenSceneGraph-like” toolbox to interact with WebGL via JavaScript, and provides facilities for exporting various assets to the osgjs format. The API is kept as similar to OpenSceneGraph as possible, providing a familiar environment to veterans of the library and introducing newcomers to a popular and heavily-scrutinzed set of interfaces. OSG.JS was developed and is maintained by Cédric Pinson, and accessible on GitHub.

== Selected uses and works ==
- Sketchfab
- Cl3ver
- Globe Tweeter
- Nouvelle Vague

== See also ==
- WebGL
- List of WebGL frameworks
