= CocoonJS =

Mobile development framework

- Original authors: Eneko Knörr, Iker Jamardo
- Developer: Ludei
- Stable release: 2.0.2 / 2017
- Operating system: Android, iOS, Pokki, Tizen, Ouya
- Type: Mobile development framework
- License: Proprietary
- Website: ludei.com

CocoonJS was a mobile development framework produced by Ludei, a San Francisco-based startup founded by serial entrepreneur Eneko Knörr. It enables software developers to build mobile apps using JavaScript, HTML5, and CSS3, instead of device-specific languages such as Objective-C. It enables wrapping up of HTML, CSS and Javascript code depending upon the platform of the device. It extends the features of HTML and Javascript to work with the device. The platform is similar to Adobe PhoneGap but claims significant improvements.

Development on the framework stopped in 2017. Ludei ceased operations in 2019.

== Engines with CocoonJS support ==
- AngularJS
- Backbone.js
- Construct 2
- Famo.us
- Goo Engine
- Handlebars.js
- ImpactJS
- Ludei CAAT
- melonJS
- Panda.js
- Phaser
- Pixi.js
- PlayCanvas
- Wozlla
