= PlayCanvas =

3D game engine

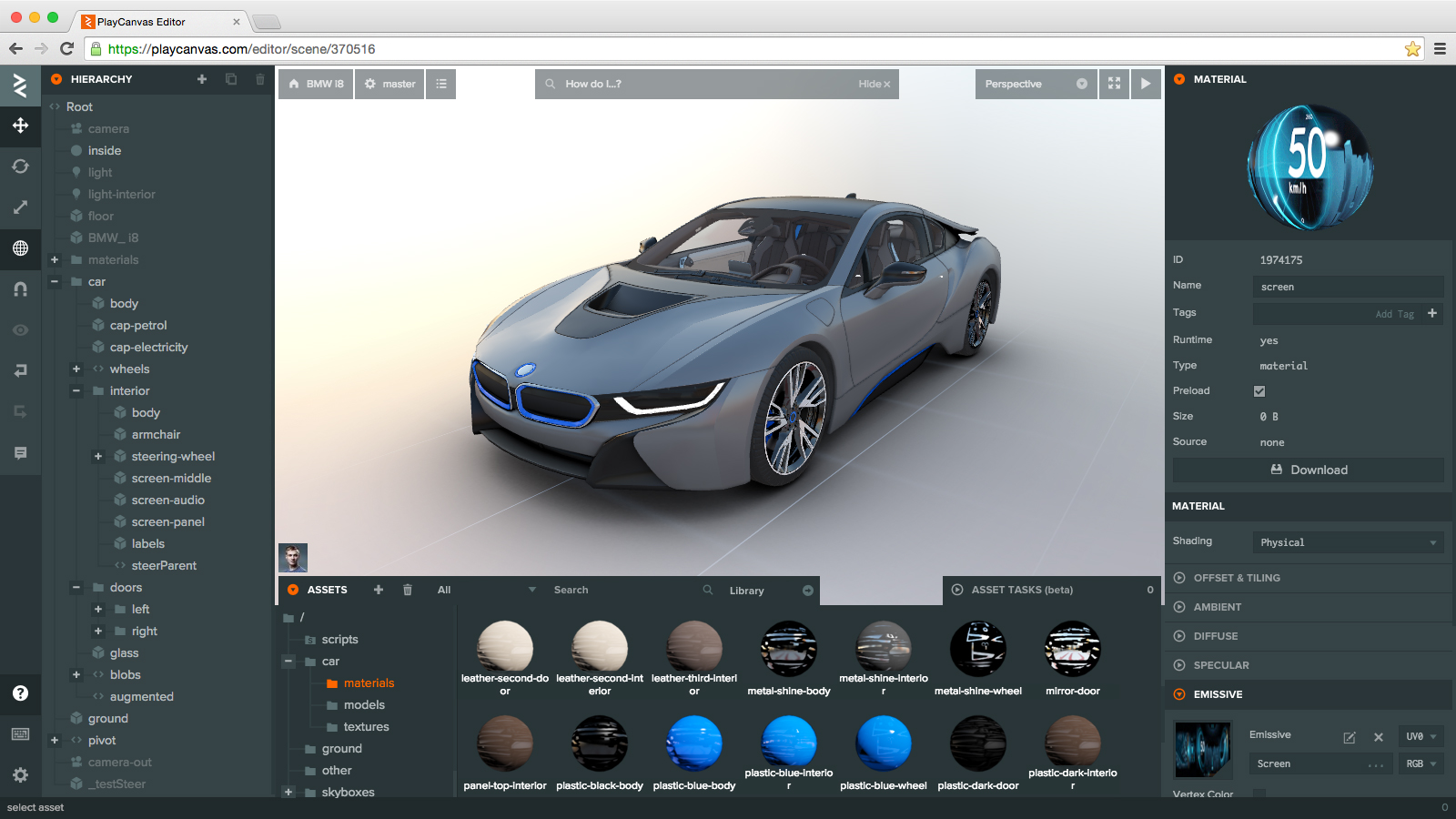
- The PlayCanvas web-based Editor and example of a 3d application in-development
- Developers: Will Eastcott, Dave Evans, Vaios Kalpias Ilias, Kevin Rooney, Maksims Mihejevs
- Written in: JavaScript
- Operating system: OS independent
- Platform: Cross-platform
- Type: HTML5 3D engine
- License: MIT License
- Website: playcanvas.com
- Repository: github.com/playcanvas/engine
- As of: July 2014

PlayCanvas is an open-source 3D game engine/interactive 3D application engine alongside a proprietary cloud-hosted creation platform that allows for simultaneous editing from multiple computers via a browser-based interface. It runs in modern browsers that support WebGL, including Mozilla Firefox and Google Chrome. The engine is capable of rigid-body physics simulation, handling three-dimensional audio and 3D animations.

PlayCanvas has gained the support of ARM, Activision and Mozilla.

The PlayCanvas engine was open-sourced on June 4, 2014.

In April 2019, BusinessInsider.com reported that the company was acquired by Snap Inc. in 2017.

== Features ==
The PlayCanvas platform has collaborative real-time Editor that allows editing a project by multiple developers simultaneously. The engine supports the WebGL 1.0 and 2.0 standard to produce GPU accelerated 3D graphics and allows for scripting via the JavaScript programming language. Projects can be distributed via a URL web link or packaged in native wrappers, p.g. for Android, using CocoonJS or for Steam using Electron, and many other options and platforms.

== Notable PlayCanvas applications ==
Various companies use PlayCanvas in projects of different disciplines of interactive 3D content in the web.

Disney created an educational game for Hour of Code based on its Moana film.

King published Shuffle Cats Mini, as a launch title for Facebook Instant Games.

TANX – massively multiplayer online game of cartoon styled tanks.

Miniclip published number of games on their platform with increase of HTML5 games popularity on the web.

Mozilla collaborated with PlayCanvas team creating After the Flood demo for presenting cutting-edge features of WebGL 2.0.

== See also ==
- List of WebGL frameworks
- List of game engines
- JavaScript
- HTML5
- WebGL
