= Keram Malicki-Sánchez =

Multimedia Producer, Musician, Actor

Keram Malicki-Sánchez is an actor, musician, writer, filmmaker, interactive media and virtual reality developer, multimedia artist, and event producer. He is the founder of the VRTO Spatial Media World Conference & Expo, and the Festival of International Virtual & Augmented Reality Stories (FIVARS).

== Acting career ==
Malicki-Sánchez is an actor with over 65 professional credits in theater, film, television and voiceover whose career debuted in musical theatre at the age of seven in the title role of Oliver! at the Limelight Dinner Theatre in Toronto. He later starred in the original musical version of Mordecai Richler's Jacob Two-Two Meets the Hooded Fang (1984) which won a Dora Mavor Moore Award for Best Revue or Musical, directed by Peter Moss. He is known by a generation as "Jonny Camden" the lead guitarist and bandleader in the eponymous band/show Catwalk produced by Franklin Waterman Entertainment (also known for 21 Jump Street). In 2013, in the role of Kenny, he was chainsawed in half by Leatherface in Texas Chainsaw 3D, a film that MTV wrote "shocked the box office with [a] #1 debut, topping both Django Unchained and The Hobbit."

In 2020 Malicki-Sanchez starred in the role of eccentric artist Zeke in a comedic web series for the Canadian Broadcasting Corporation called 'Decoys' whose ensemble cast was nominated at the Canadian Screen Awards for Best Web Series.

== Musical career ==
In 1990, he founded the record label Constant Change Productions out of Toronto, and formed his band, Blue Dog Pict. The band released three albums: The Picture Album (1990), Anxiety of Influence: a nodding into...? (1992), and Spindly Light Und Wax Rocketines (1995), all distributed by Montreal's Distribution FUSION III.

In 1995, Constant Change released Irrevocable Upgrade, a compilation of exotic musical works which Malicki-Sanchez curated and produced.

In 1998, Malicki-Sanchez launched the band Ribcage, with Eric Ryder Costello and Paul Gallinato, and toured Cleveland and New York, releasing one album, For Machines to Dream About. In 2003 he wrote and performed the song The Truth Be Told for the film Uptown Girls.

In January 2008, Malicki-Sanchez began releasing albums under the solo name Keram, launching a music video for the song Antiskeptic, before releasing his solo debut acoustic album Box.

In 2014, he released the album Come to Life, which includes contributions from over 30 musicians, including Alex Lifeson on guitar. He later crowdfunded to produce three songs: (Don't Get Caught) By the Dazzling Charades (2018), Artificial Intelligence (2019) and That Light (2020).

He has also composed for several movies and TV series including for New Line Cinema, MGM, and shown on Lifetime Movie Network and PixL: Mr. Write (2016), Twist of Fate (2016), Bad Date Chronicles (2017),Same Time Next Week (2017) and Sleeping With Danger (2020).

== Filmmaking ==
Malicki-Sanchez received certificates in cinematography, digital media, film producing, and UX design at UCLA Extension. His first short film A Killer App won the Best Monster Creation award winner at the 2010 Shockfest Film Festival. His short film Tulip Pink was screened at the 2011 Newport Beach Film Festival and other film festivals. His third short How (Not) To Become a Vampire made the festival rounds in 2011, screening at the Austin Film Festival and winning a People's Choice Award at the Zero Film Festival in Toronto.

== New media ==
In 1994, Malicki-Sánchez founded Robot Pride Day, an ironic annual festival that is still celebrated.

In September 2008, Malicki-Sanchez launched Keramcast, a podcast that was a digest for the topics discussed on his various blogs, and IndieGameReviewer.com, also referred to as 'IGR', an indie game review blog where he remains Editor-In-Chief as of 2026. In 2023, Malicki-Sanchez also launched TableTopQuester.com, which was the equivalent for tabletop games.

== Game Design ==
He was the lead playtest designer on narrative cosmic horror VR experience Broken Spectre from Games by Stitch Studios which won the VR Awards Experience of the Year in 2023.

In April 2026, he launched Esoteric Card Games, a subscription-based online portal focused on the study of antique card games from the 1500s onward. He also designed The Final Wave, and "The Night Ponder", released on Steam in 2026.

== Virtual reality and immersive technology ==
In 2015, Malicki-Sanchez founded VRTO – a Toronto-based virtual and augmented reality meetup whose inaugural event was held at Ryerson University's Student Learning Center, and Transportive Technology – a virtual-reality content production company which saw Malicki-Sanchez teaming up with Lee Towndrow to create one of the world's first 360 ASMR Immersive videos. This led to the creation of FIVARS, the "Festival of International Virtual and Augmented Reality Stories" which he co-organized with technical director Joseph Ellsworth.

FIVARS debuted at Toronto's Camp Wavelength music festival, and showed the first full viewing of MansLaughter by Cinemersia, which claims to be the world's first virtual reality feature film. FIVARS had its inaugural show in Toronto on 19 and 20 September 2015. A second FIVARS, was shown on September 16–18, 2016, at MSMU Studios – a 5,000 square-foot Toronto warehouse.

Malicki-Sanchez then created the VRTO Virtual & Augmented Reality World Conference & Expo

In 2020, during the COVID-19 pandemic, Malicki-Sanchez launched a company called Spatialized Events, so as to move his terrestrial events into virtual space using WebXR.

Later that year, working with lead developer James Baicoianu, he designed a variety 3D worlds for the Festival of International Virtual & Augmented Reality Stories virtual events using threejs and Blender, and JanusXR, and open source mult8user framework Web-based Virtual Reality engine. The result was a virtual 360 theater that could play stereoscopic 5.7k spherical video with ambisonic audio, VOIP, and video chat (all programmed using the elation engine and powered by JanusWeb and AWS. Malicki-Sanchez developed interfaces and tools to create a solution that could be licensed to 3rd party festivals and conferences.

In 2020, Keram's essays were published in two books: Handbook of Research on the Global Impacts and Roles of Immersive Media, edited by Jacquelyn Ford Morie and Kate McCallum, and Dyscorpia: Future Intersections of the Body and Technology.

In September 2021 Malicki-Sanchez was included in the 100 Original Voices in XR list created by former Apple and Google developer Avi Bar-Zeev.

He was awarded "Creator of the Year" at 2022 Poly Awards for WebXR development of these WebXR festivals, world design, 360 video productions, and online conference.

He produced and brought VRTO back as an in-person event 2022 through 2025 at OCAD University in Toronto, curating a conference about the current surge in text-to-image GAN art and virtual production for television, live XR performance, and representation of diverse voices in the spatial computing industry.

He began teaching Blender for Web3D at UCLA Extension in the fall of 2022. which became Blender Foundations for Spatial Media in 2024.

He was recognized as an Ethical Value Awards Finalists by the national XRGuild in 2024.

== Television appearances ==
- Faerie Tale Theatre (1985), Lame Boy, Willie
- Amerika (1987), Young Caleb
- I'll Take Manhattan (1987), Justin Amberville (child)
- Zardip's Search for Healthy Wellness (1988), Zardip
- The Ray Bradbury Theater (1988), Martin
- Summer Storm (1988), Joey
- Street Legal (1988), Tom Prouse
- Friday the 13th: The Series, Ricky (1988) and Peter Marshak (1989)
- War of the Worlds (1989–1990), Ceeto
- Katts and Dog (1992)
- Catwalk (1992–1993), Johnny Camden
- Ready or Not (1993–1996), The Liz
- TekWar: TekLab (1994), Mustapha
- L.A. Doctors (1999), Alex Atcheson
- Silk Stalkings (1999), Lyn Mocrief and Monk
- Late Last Night (1999), Drag Queen
- Buffy the Vampire Slayer (1999), Freddy Iverson - Episode "Earshot"
- ER (1999), Rick and Goth Kid
- 24 (2001), Larry Rogow
- The Guardian (2003), Lucas Farr
- CSI: Crime Scene Investigation (2004), Jamal
- The Jane Show (2004), Iggy
- Without a Trace (2005), Scott
- The L Word (2006), Chase
- Saving Grace (2007), Razor
- Endgame (2011), Naveed
- Charlie's Angels (2011), Lee Bowen
- The Mentalist (2012), Tookie Burroughs
- Flashpoint (2012), Pete Joris
- True Blood (2012), Elijah Stormer
- Decoys (2020), Zeke

== Filmography ==
- Eleni (1985), Nick's Son
- Boulevard (1994), Sister
- No Contest (1994), Cal
- Skin Deep (1995), Chris Black
- American History X (1998), Chris
- Drive Me Crazy (1999), Rupert
- Cherry Falls (2000), Timmy
- Happy Campers (2001), Jasper
- Crazy/Beautiful (2001), Foster
- John Q (2002), Freddy B
- Global Heresy (Rock My World (US)) (2002), Flit
- Something In Between (2002), Jon Talents
- The Tulse Luper Suitcases, Part 2: Vaux to the Sea (2004), Virgil de Selincourt
- Little Black Book (2004), Waiter
- Queen West (2005), Ross
- Cake (2005), Frank
- Sex and Death 101 (2007), Master Bitchslap
- Punisher: War Zone (2008), Ink
- One Kine Day (2010), Vegas Mike
- A Killer App (2010), Director/Writer/Producer/Editor
- Tulip Pink (2011), Director/Writer/Producer
- How (Not) To Become a Vampire (2011), Director/Producer/Editor
- Irvine Welsh's Ecstasy (2011), Ally
- Texas Chainsaw 3D (2013), Kenny
- The Christmas Switch (2014), Manny
- Anyone Home? (2018), Dean
- Being Perfectly Frank (2020), Kyle

== Voice Acting appearances ==
- The Care Bears (1986), various
- Clifford the Big Red Dog (1988) various
- Garbage Pail Kids (1988)
- Daniel Tiger's Neighborhood (2022), Felipe
