= Google Health =

Google Health may refer to:

- Google Health (app), a health-tracking app that replaced the Fitbit app
- Google Health (initiative), an initiative later rebranded "Google for Health"
  - Google Health (division), a defunct division that was redeveloped into the initiative
- Google Health (service), a discontinued service for storing personal health records

== See also ==
- Fitbit, a product line of health-related consumer hardware
- Google Fit, a discontinued health-tracking app that was merged into the Google Health app
- Google Body, a discontinued app that rendered 3D anatomical models of the human body
- Google Flu Trends, a discontinued service that provided influenza-activity data
