= Zardip's Search for Healthy Wellness =

Canadian educational television show

- Genre: Children's television series
- Starring: Keram Malicki-Sánchez; Ted Follows; Valerie Politis, Shani Kernerman
- Country of origin: Canada
- Original language: English
- No. of seasons: 1
- No. of episodes: 13

Production
- Production locations: Toronto, Ontario, Canada
- Running time: 15 minutes

Original release
- Network: TVOntario
- Release: September 1 – November 24, 1988

Zardip's Search for Healthy Wellness is a Canadian educational television show from the 1980s intended to teach public health messages to children. The show's 13 episode arc featured Zardip Pacific, played by Keram Malicki-Sánchez, a robot alien from a planet whose robot inhabitants are breaking down as they do not know how to live a healthy lifestyle. In a top-secret mission, he is sent to the planet Earth to report the habits of humans to his commander Highship. On Earth, Zardip befriends a group of pre-teens who have a special shed called the Healthy Hideaway, where they hang out and talk about healthy stuff, sports and more. They instruct their new odd and strangely clueless friend Zardip on topics ranging from nutrition, to exercise, to germs all the while unaware of Zardip's true alien identity.

The show has a strong cult following for students who attended grade school in the late 1980s and early 1990s, due to memories of watching the videocassettes in class, or watching the shows as they aired on TVOntario.

== Episodes ==
1. Zardip's Quest 9/1/88

2. The Human Body 9/8/88

3. Food 9/15/88

4. More Food 9/22/88

5. Growth 9/29/88

6. Exercise 10/6/88

7. Sleep 10/13/88

8. Germs 10/20/88

9. More Germs 10/27/88

10. Teeth 11/3/88

11. The Dentist 11/10/88

12. Safety 11/17/88

13. Environmental Health 11/24/88
