= Kent Bye =

American journalist

Kent Bye (born 1976) is an American podcaster and experiential journalist based in Portland, Oregon. He is the founder and host of the Voices of VR podcast, and a keynote speaker, panelist, and moderator at international industry conferences including Games for Change, Silicon Valley Virtual Reality (SVVR), SXSW, and VR NOW.

In the Voices of VR podcast, he has covered the fields of virtual reality and augmented reality.

== Voices of VR Podcast ==
Kent Bye launched Voices of VR in May 2014. The podcast features game developers, technologists, academics, creatives, and enthusiasts in the fields of VR and AR, and currently has hundreds of episodes including Greg Panos, Jaroslav Beck, Jessica Brillhart, Nancy Baker Cahill, Jesse Damiani, Tom Furness, Palmer Luckey, Kevin Mack, Danny O’Brien, Tony Parisi, Nonny de la Peña, Philip Rosedale, Keram Malicki-Sanchez and Adam Sulzdorf-Liszkiewicz.

In 2015, a virtual reality blog called Road to VR started to syndicate all future episodes of the Voices of VR podcast on their website.

As of January 2021, the Voices of VR podcast has released over 973 episodes.

== Ethics of XR ==
Bye is an advocate for discourse around the ethics and moral dilemmas presented by VR and AR.

In March 2019 at Laval Virtual, Bye took part in a think tank called "Future Dreaming: Designing for New Realities." On May 31, 2019, Bye presented a keynote at Augmented World Expo which summarized the ethical implications explored during Laval Virtual and through his interviews with subject experts for Voices of VR. This presentation formed the foundation of what would ultimately become the "XR Ethics Manifesto" that Bye presented on October 18, 2019, at xRS Week from Greenlight Insights.
