= Paloma Dawkins =

- Occupation: Artist

Paloma Dawkins is a cartoonist, animator and video game creator who is known for works that blur the line between natural and game environments. Her works include Gardenarium (2015), Alea (2015), Palmystery and Museum of Symmetry. Her games from game jams include Paint Bug (2016) and Egg Boss (2014).
