= ZygoteBody =

3D web application of the human body

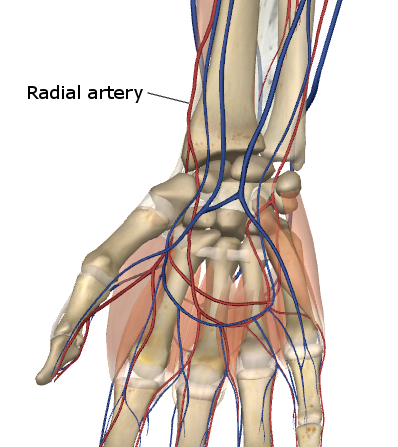
Labeled view of the right radial artery from Zygote Body

ZygoteBody, formerly Google Body, is a web application by Zygote Media Group that renders manipulable 3D anatomical models of the human body. Several layers, from muscle tissues down to blood vessels, can be removed or made transparent to allow better study of individual body parts. Most of the body parts are labelled and are searchable.

== Technology ==
The human models are based on data from the Zygote Media Group. The website uses JavaScript and WebGL technology to display 3D images inside the web browser without requiring the installation of external browser plug-ins.

== History ==
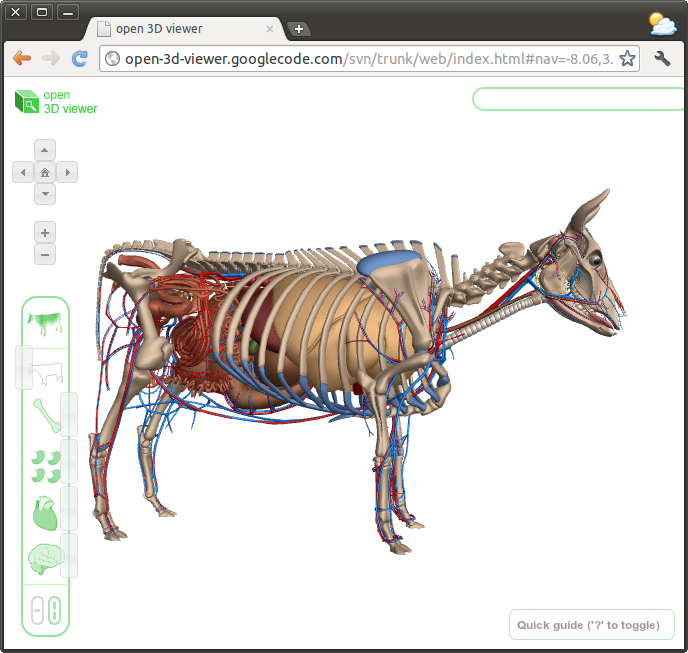
The Google Cow model, now part of the open-3d-viewer project

ZygoteBody was launched as Google Body on December 15, 2010. On April Fools' Day 2011, users were greeted with the anatomy of a cow on the home page. The cow model is still available as part of the open-3d-viewer open source project.

As part of the wind down on Google Labs, it was announced that Google Body will be shut down but will continue to be maintained by Zygote as ZygoteBody. On October 13, 2011, the Google Body site was shut down. Then, on January 9, 2012, ZygoteBody was launched and core code base (with the Google Cow model as a demo) was made available as an open source project called open-3d-viewer.

== See also ==
- Visible Human Project
- Google Health (disambiguation)
- Anatomography
