= SXSW V2V =

Technology and entrepreneurial conference

- SXSW V2V 2013 Logo
- Dates: July 13–16, 2014
- Frequency: Annual
- Locations: Las Vegas, Nevada, United States
- Years active: 13
- Inaugurated: 2013
- Most recent: 2015
- Organizer: SXSW Inc.
- Website: sxswv2v.com

SXSW V2V was an annual technology and entrepreneurship conference that served as a spin-off from the South by Southwest (SXSW) festival, running from 2013 to 2015. The event was held in Las Vegas, Nevada, marking the first time an SXSW-branded event took place outside of its traditional home in Austin, Texas. Created as an evolution of the startup competition from SXSW Interactive, SXSW V2V expanded its scope to include a vibrant blend of activities designed to support entrepreneurs and startups. The conference featured a dynamic mix of programming, including a high-profile startup competition that showcased emerging companies, interactive panel discussions led by industry experts, and mentoring workshops aimed at providing practical guidance to business founders. Beyond its professional agenda, SXSW V2V embraced the creative and cultural spirit of its parent festival, with a robust after-hours lineup that included live comedy performances, film screenings, and music showcases, offering attendees opportunities to network and unwind in an engaging, multidisciplinary environment.

== About ==
The company said variously that V2V stands for "Vision to Venture", "Visionaries to Vegas", and “Voice to Voice", describing the focus of the conference on finding, financing, and developing new businesses. The conference started with the recognition that the three large spring festivals that SXSW, Inc. holds in Austin were straining the hotel capacity of that city.

== V2Venture Competition ==
One of the main events was the V2Venture startup competition, where startup companies competed under five categories. Participating companies represented the fields of Culture and Education Technology, Education Technology, Health Technology, Innovative World Technologies, and Mobile and Tablet Technology.

=== Finalists ===
Trackster, the world's first studio network for the re-amping of guitar recordings, was a finalist in the "Culture and Entertainment Technology" category in 2013.

3DLT, a company that serves as a repository of 3D printing designs, was a finalist in the "Innovative World Technology" category in 2013, as was Cl3ver, a real time 3D engine to share interactive scenes on any online device.

== Notable speakers ==
Speakers at the inaugural event included Zappos founder and CEO Tony Hsieh.
