= ARKit =

Augmented reality API for Apple platforms

ARKit is an application programming interface (API) for iOS, iPadOS and VisionOS which lets third-party developers build augmented reality apps, taking advantage of a device's camera, CPU, GPU, and motion sensors. The ARKit functionality is only available to users of devices with Apple A9 and later processors. According to Apple, this is because "these processors deliver breakthrough performance that enables fast scene understanding and lets you build detailed and compelling virtual content on top of real-world scenes." The SDK was first released for IOS 11 in 2017, and was preinstalled in the initial release of IPadOS 13 in 2019 and visionOS 1.0 in 2024. In visionOS, however, ARKit plays a lesser role in augmented reality than in iOS and iPadOS. ARKit in visionOS is focused on acquiring data about the person's surroundings, while SwiftUI and RealityKit control the placement of any 2D or 3D content in the person's surroundings, and SwiftUI or UIKit are used to build windows with an app's content.

== Background ==
ARKit incorporates computer-vision and SLAM technology developed in part by Metaio, a Munich-based augmented reality company founded in 2003. Apple acquired Metaio in May 2015, absorbing its engineering team, which had accumulated over 100 patent applications in augmented reality. Former Metaio engineers joined Apple's Technology Development Group before ARKit was publicly released with iOS 11 at the Worldwide Developers Conference in June 2017.

== See also ==
- ARCore – Software development kit for building augmented reality applications
- OpenXR – Standard for access to virtual reality and augmented reality platforms and devices
