= JanusVR =

Virtual reality company

- Type: Private
- Founded: 2014
- Founder: James McCrae; Karan Singh
- Defunct: 2019
- Headquarters: San Mateo, California, USA
- Website: janusvr.com

JanusVR was a company based in San Mateo, California, and Toronto, Ontario, that developed virtual reality web browsing software. It was founded by James McCrae and Karan Singh in December 2014. Named after Janus, the Roman God of passages, JanusVR portrayed web content in multi-dimensional spaces interconnected by portals. The company shut down in 2019, but released their code as open source in the hopes that the community would continue its development.

== Company ==
The founders of JanusVR came from the Dynamic Graphics Project, Computer Science at the University of Toronto. Development of JanusVR began in the middle of 2013, with early progress documented on the Oculus VR Rift Forum, and subsequently in the JanusVR subreddit. In August 2015, JanusVR joined the Boost.VC accelerator program, and raised a Seed Series round with Lerer Hippeau Ventures.
