= ARCore =

Software development kit for building augmented reality applications

Google Play Services for AR
- Developer: Google
- Initial release: February 23, 2018; 8 years ago
- Stable release: 1.45.2420502 / August 14, 2024; 20 months ago
- Operating system: Android
- Platform: Android 7.0 and later
- Website: developers.google.com/ar/

Google Play Services for AR, (formerly known as ARCore) is a software development kit developed by Google that allows for augmented reality (AR) applications to be built. ARCore has been certified for a number of devices, but is software-locked on devices that did not complete the certification procedure. Spoofing the ID of a device that completed the procedure makes ARCore work on more devices. Requirements for certification include the "quality of the camera, motion sensors [and] a powerful enough CPU that integrates with the hardware design". Devices must also ship with Google Play to qualify for placement on the list of supported devices. New devices can be submitted through the Google AR OEM Portal.

== Key technologies ==
ARCore uses a few key technologies to integrate virtual content with the real world as seen through the camera of a smartphone or tablet. Each of these technologies can be utilized by developers to create an AR experience.

=== Six degrees of freedom ===
- Allows the phone to understand and track its position relative to the world.
- A motion tracking process known as simultaneous localization and mapping (SLAM) utilizes feature points - which are visually distinct objects within camera view - to provide focal points for the phone to determine proper positioning (pose) of the device.

=== Environmental understanding ===
- Allows the phone to detect the size and location of flat surfaces - both vertical and horizontal - with feature points.
- Geometric plane can be calculated based on detected feature points.
- A scene semantics API is used to gather real-time semantic data about the user's surroundings and uses that data to identify objects and features in view.

=== Light estimation ===
- Lighting Estimation API allows the phone to estimate the environment's current lighting conditions and display images accurately in relation to real-world lighting.
  - Lighting cues such as shadows and highlights are used to more immersively display virtual objects.

=== Depth analysis ===
- Utilizes the phone's camera to create depth maps, which enable the device to more accurately determine the amount of space between surfaces based on what is captured.
  - In order to properly assess the real world, depth maps are created to measure the amount of space between objects or surfaces.
  - A depth-from-motion algorithm takes the motion data from the user's camera and utilizes it to create a more detailed depth map.

=== Geospatial capabilities ===
- This function's API uses GPS and allows creators to give users unique experiences based on their real-world location.
  - Google's visual positioning system (VPS) is utilized for this process.
- Matches the user's visual data with that of Google Maps to determine precise location.

== See also ==
- ARKit – Augmented reality API for Apple platforms
- OpenXR – Standard for access to virtual reality and augmented reality platforms and devices
