= Virtual reality in fiction =

The concept of virtual reality (VR) has been depicted in numerous fictional works since the 1930s.

== Evolution of VR in fiction ==
Many science fiction books and films have imagined characters being "trapped in virtual reality" or entering into virtual reality. A number have promoted the idea of virtual reality as a partial, but not total, substitution for the misery of reality, or have touted it as a method for creating virtual worlds in which one may escape from Earth. These narratives often depict VR as a utopian haven and also a potential dystopian method of control and isolation. Some of these fictional depictions parallel real-world development of VR technology, showing both the hopeful potential of VR and also the ethical questions of its use. Additionally, many fictional representations of VR serve as a critique of contemporary technology trends, providing cautionary tales about unchecked digital expansion.

== Technological and psychological themes ==
Fictional VR systems often emphasize sensory immersion, integration with artificial intelligence, and dissolution between reality and simulation. Current academic discussions highlight how VR storytelling shapes user aspirations and anxieties. VR fiction creates utopian fantasies alongside nightmares of surveillance and data protection. Similarly, audience responses to VR-based non-fiction indicate that immersive storytelling can enhance emotional engagement but also raise ethical concerns about realism and manipulation. Additionally, VR fiction also explores the effects of long-term exposure to virtual worlds on human cognition and behavior, such as issues of identity and mental health. The psychological effects of VR engagement in fiction often mirror real-world concerns about digital escapism and the impact of prolonged screen exposure on mental well-being. For instance, the novel Additionally, studies on VR addiction have highlighted potential risks similar to those depicted in fictional works.

== Fictional Representations of Virtual Reality ==
| Format | Year | Title | Author/Director | Notes |
|---|---|---|---|---|
| Short story | 1933 | The Man Who Awoke | Laurence Manning' | Part of a series of short stories, later a novel. It describes a time when people ask to be connected to a machine that replaces all their senses with electrical impulses and, thus, live a virtual life chosen by them (à la The Matrix, but voluntary, not imposed) |
| Short story | 1935 | Pygmalion's Spectacles | Stanley G. Weinbaum | A comprehensive and specific fictional model for virtual reality which described a device capable of immersing a user in a fully interactive virtual environment. |
| Short story | 1950 | The Veldt | Ray Bradbury | A couple's advanced-technology house includes an immersive virtual-reality nursery for the couple's children, who often set it to a disturbingly realistic scene in the African veldt, complete with feeding lions. The couple become unsettled by the house and nursery, but when they plan to leave, the children lock them into the nursery. |
| Short Story | 1961 | "I (Profesor Corcoran)", translated in English as "Further Reminiscences of Ijon Tichy I", | Stanislaw Lem | Concerns a scientist who created a number of computer-simulated people living in a virtual world. '. Lem further explored the implications of what he termed "phantomatics" in his nonfictional 1964 treatise Summa Technologiae' |
| Television miniseries | 1973 | World on a Wire | Rainer Werner Fassbinder | based on Daniel F. Galouye's novel Simulacron-3, shows a virtual reality simulation inside another virtual reality simulation. |
| Television episodes | 1976 | Doctor Who | | 4 episode story arc first broadcast starting in October 1976, introduced a dream-like computer-generated reality, known as the Matrix. |
| Film | 1982 | Tron | | Story of a computer hacker sucked into a digital world physically inside a computer system. He attempted to escape with the help of the titular hero, a computer program within that virtual reality. |
| Film | 1983 | Brainstorm | | Starring Natalie Wood andChristopher Walken film the story revolves around the production, use, and misuse of a VR device. |
| Novel | 1984 | Neuromancer | William Gibson | The novel predicted cyberspace, which influenced the cyberpunk movement and the public's perception of VR while also critiquing corporate dominance and the loss of personal agency in a world where cyberspace is controlled by powerful entities. |
| Television series | 1987-1994 | Star Trek: The Next Generation | | The holodeck featured in Star Trek: The Next Generation is one of the best known examples of virtual reality in popular culture, including the ability for users to interactively modify scenarios in real time with a natural language interface. The depiction differs from others in the use of a physical room rather than a neural interface or headset. |
| Film | 1990 | Total Recall | Paul Verhoeven | Based on the Philip K. Dick story "We Can Remember It for You Wholesale" |
| Film | 1991 | Until the End of the World | Wim Wenders | * A VR-like system, used to record and play back dreams, figures centrally. |
| Film | 1992 | The Lawnmower Man | | A research scientist uses a VR system to jumpstart the mental and physical development of his mentally handicapped gardener. |
| Novel | 1992 | Snow Crash | Neal Stephenson | Introduces a virtual metaverse where digital avatars interact in a vast virtual society. |
| Film | 1993 | Arcade | | Centered around a new virtual reality game (from which the film gets its name) that actively traps those who play it inside its world. |
| Novel | 1994 | Virtual Light | William Gibson | Presentations viewable in VR-like goggles was used as the MacGuffin. |
| Novel | 1994 | The Hacker and the Ants | Rudy Rucker | Features a programmer who uses VR for robot design and testing. |
| Television series | 1994-1996 | VR Troopers | | Syndicated superhero television series produced by Haim Sabanwhere the titular characters fight villains that seek to invade from the virtual world. |
| Film | 1995 | Strange Days | | Science-fiction thriller about a fictional virtual reality trend in which users buy illegal VR recordings of criminal offences recorded from the offender's point of view (POV). |
| Film | 1995 | Johnny Mnemonic | | The main character Johnny (played by Keanu Reeves) use virtual reality goggles and brain–computer interfaces to access the Internet and extract encrypted information in his own brain. |
| Film | 1995 | Virtuosity | | Russell Crowe portrays a virtual reality serial killer name SID 6.7 (Sadistic, Intelligent and Dangerous) who is used in a simulation to train real-world police officer, but manages to escape into the real world. |
| Television episode | 1995 | The Outer Limits (1995 TV series) | | The episode "Virtual Future " uses VR in its story line. |
| Television episodes | 1995 | The Outer Limits | | The following episodes featured virtual reality: In season 2 episode 11, "The Refuge" terminally ill patients are cryogenically frozen and experience a virtual reality world while being unconscious.; Season 2 episode 22, "The Sentence" features an experimental virtual reality prison where inmates can experience decades of imprisonment in a few minutes of real world time. |
| Television series (animated) | 1996-1997 | The Real Adventures of Jonny Quest | | Features the virtual reality of QuestWorld. |
| Novel series | 1996-2001 | Otherland | Tad Williams | Shows a world where the Internet has become accessible via virtual reality. It depicts VR as a huge digital universe where users venture into complex virtual worlds. The novels explore the consequences of prolonged VR immersion, where users become disconnected from reality. |
| Film | 1997 | Open Your Eyes | | A Spanish film. It has the main character experiencing a simulated reality world while being cryogenically frozen for 150 years. Remade in 2001 as Vanilla Sky |
| Television episode | 1998 | Better Than Life | | The episode portrays a VR that allows its users to experience a utopia. In the novel adaptations of the series, headsets for the game are treated like an illicit drug, and the main characters end up spending many years unknowingly connected. |
| Film | 1999 | The Thirteenth Floor | | An adaptation of Daniel F. Galouye's novel Simulacron-3, and tells about two virtual reality simulations, one in another. |
| Film series | 1999 | The Matrix | Lana and Lilly Wachowski | Including later sequels, explored the possibility that our world is actually a vast virtual reality (or more precisely, simulated reality) created by artificially intelligent machines. |
| Film | 1999 | eXistenZ | David Cronenberg | A film in which level switches occur so seamlessly and numerously that at the end of the movie it is difficult to tell whether the main characters are back in "reality". |
| Film | 2001 | Vanilla Sky | | Remake of 1997 Spanish film "Open Your Eyes". |
| Novel | 2004 | Epic | Conor Kostick | Children's novel ' |
| Television series | 2008 | Sliders | | In the fourth episode of the fourth season Quinn Mallory and his friends land on a world where everyone uses virtual reality all the time. |
| Film | 2009 | Avatar | | Humans are hooked up via advanced technologies with avatars, enabling the Na'vi avatars to remotely perform the actions of the humans that they wouldn't do on the gas-based planet Pandora. |
| Film | 2009 | Surrogates | | Features a brain–computer interface that allows people to control realistic humanoid robots, giving them full sensory feedback. |
| Radio | 2009 | Planet B | | Broadcast by BBC Radio 7, a science-fiction drama set in a virtual world,Planet B was the largest ever commission for an original drama programme. |
| Film | 2010 | Inception | | About a professional thief who steals information by infiltrating the subconscious. He creates artificial thoughts that are so realistic that once they are implanted in a person's mind, the person thinks these are their own thoughts. |
| Novel | 2011 | Ready Player One | Ernest Cline | A virtual reality story based upon video games. It explores a virtual reality system called the OASIS that people use to escape from the grim reality of a dying Earth in 2045. VR has become a dominant social and economic sphere and it warns of a future where society becomes overly dependent on it to escape real-world issues. |
| Television series (anime) | 2012-2020 | Sword Art Online | Based on the young adult novels by Reki Kawahara | *Involves the concept of a virtual reality MMORPG of the same name, with the possibility of dying in real life when a player dies in the game due to the intended effect of the NerveGear. In the 2014 sequel Sword Art Online II, the idea of bringing a virtual character into the real world via mobile cameras is posed; this concept is used to allow a bedridden individual to attend public school for the first time. The next two sequels take place in "The Underworld", another virtual world made with "mnemonic visuals" and bottom up AIs known as "Fluctlights". |
| Television series (anime) | 2012-2020 | Accel World | | Expands the concept of virtual reality using the game Brain Burst, a game which allows players to gain and receive points to keep accelerating; accelerating is when an individual's brain perceives the images around them 1000 times faster, heightening their sense of awareness. This series takes place in the same universe as Sword Art Online |
| Television series | 2016-2019 (Note: Years episodes aired) | Black Mirror | | The following episodes of Black Mirror have featured virtual reality: Playtest (2016) features an American traveler (portrayed by Wyatt Russell) who signs up to test a revolutionary new gaming system developed by the video game company SaitoGemu, but soon can't tell where the hot game ends and reality begins.; San Junipero (2016) features a simulated reality set in different time periods at the titular beach resort town that the characters can inhabit, even past death, as seen with its main characters (portrayed by Gugu Mbatha-Raw and Mackenzie Davis). San Junipero is made by the company TCKR Systems as the robots there maintain it.; USS Callister (2017) features Callister Inc.'s MMORPG game "Infinity" that uses virtual reality from TCKR Systems. Utilizing virtual reality technology in his modded "Infinity" game, Callister Inc.'s CTO Robert Daly (portrayed by Jesse Plemons) portrays the captain of the titular ship from his favorite show "Space Fleet" where he orders around the crew members who are sentient digital clones of his Callister Inc. co-workers made from the Digital Clone Replicator that he has which scanned whatever DNA they had on an item that Daly secretly obtained.; Striking Vipers (2019) features two friends (portrayed by Anthony Mackie and Yahya Abdul-Mateen II) starting to have sex in a virtual reality fighting game called "Striking Vipers X." |
| Television series | 2016-2019 (Note: Years episodes aired) | Agents of S.H.I.E.L.D. (4th-6th season) | | * In the fourth season of ', Leo Fitz created the Framework as a training program that was expanded into a virtual reality by Holden Radcliffe. When AIDA reworked the Framework, she created a virtual reality in it in where HYDRA ruled the world. After AIDA concluded her plan by creating a real body for herself, she arranged for the Framework to be deleted as its virtual inhabitants are slowly deleted.: In season five, a possible future involving a broken Earth and the Kree ruling the Lighthouse had Deke Shaw rebooting the Framework allowing the Lighthouse's inhabitants to use it for leisure in exchange for currency.; In season six, the Framework technology was used by a time-displaced Deke Shaw to create the virtual reality game "Remorath Rumble" that was produced by his unnamed tech company. "Remorath Rumble" enables the players to aid Quake in fighting the invading Kree and Remorath soldiers as well as flying a Confederacy Destroyer Ship.. |
| Film | 2017 | OtherLife | | Science fiction thriller film about a form of biological virtual reality. |
| Film | 2018 | Ready Player One | Steven Spielberg | An adaptation of Ernest Cline's novel of the same name about a VR entertainment universe known as the OASIS. The film is set in the near future of 2045 James Halliday creates this virtual reality world called the oasis. Halliday left his immense fortune and control of the Oasis to the winner of a contest designed to find a worthy heir. |
| Television series | 2019-2020 | Supergirl (season 5) | | In the fifth season Andrea Rojas' company Obsidian Tech started to develop the Obsidian Lenses that enabled the users to enter virtual reality. Though this was secretly a plot by Leviathan to secretly trap them in virtual reality. Leviathan's plot was thwarted by Supergirl and Lena Luthor |
| Television series | 2020 | Upload | | Comedic series set in 2033 with the premise that humans are able to upload themselves to a malleable simulated afterlife of their choosing. |
| Television episode | 2020 | The Twilight Zone (2019 TV series) | J. D. Dillard(director)/Jordan Peele(writer) | Episode titled "Downtime" featured a virtual reality called "SleepAway". This virtual reality has people entering it when sleeping. When a man named S. Phineas Howell was using it while playing as a hotel manager named Michelle Weaver (portrayed by Morena Baccarin). When Howell had a heart attack while using SleepAway and is in a coma explaining why she has no memory of her real life as Phineas, a customer service worker on "SleepAway" named Tom (portrayed by Tony Hale) informs her that Howell has died and offers her a deal to remain awake as part of a deal to become an NPC. Michelle accepts the deal and continues her work as a hotel manager. |
| Film | 2021 | Free Guy | Shawn Levy/(director) Matt Lieberman and Zak Penn (writers) | Takes place inside a virtual reality video game where the titular character "Guy", an NPC, becomes self aware that he's living in a simulation. |
| Television episode | 2021 | Creepshow | | The episode featured the Immersopod invented by Simon Sherman (portrayed by Justin Long). The Immersopod is outfitted with hundreds of cameras that acts as a home theater, allowing people to immerse themselves into and interact with any movie they want with Horror Express and Night of the Living Dead as examples |
| Television series | 2022-2023 | The Peripheral | | Based on William Gibson's 2014 novel The Peripheral. Set in the year 2032 it features futuristic virtual reality technology worn by a gamer Finn Fisher (portrayed by Chloë Grace Moretz). |
| Novel | 2024 | The Downloaded | Robert J. Sawyer | Two different groups have had their consciousnesses uploaded into virtual worlds contained in quantum computers. One is a group of astronauts who enter a simulation designed to retain their conscious minds while their cryogenically preserved bodies travel by spaceship to Proxima Centauri, the other a group of convicts serving out a virtual prison sentence. The two groups emerge 500 years later only to discover that the mission never launched and that the Earth has undergone an apocalyptic transformation. |
| Audio Book | 2025 | The Downloaded 2: Ghosts in the Machine | Robert J. Sawyer | 500 years after the events of The Downloaded, the convict and astronaut characters from that book are forced back into their quantum virtual worlds where they have to contend with their own digital duplicates and a plot to eliminate their conscious identities. Narrated by Brendan Fraser. |
| Television series | 2026 | VisionQuest | | The synthetic character Vision has designed a virtual reality inside his physical body which he visits on a regular basis. Both Vision and the artificial intelligences living there has human avatars and eat and drink simulations of human food. Other virtual worlds are able to temporarily fuse with Vision's world. |

== VR in gaming and interactive fiction ==
In VR gaming interactive media often incorporates artificial intelligence and responsive narrative with increasing regularity. The use of VR in crime fiction education has been studied, highlighting the potential for immersive simulation to enhance narrative experience and audience participation. Furthermore, the creation of VR-based role-playing games and virtual communities in contemporary gaming culture suggests a merging of reality and fiction with increasing regularity. As VR technology becomes more sophisticated, game developers are exploring new methods to heighten player immersion, incorporating haptic feedback and AI-driven narratives that adapt to user choices. For example, the game Half-Life: Alyx (2020) by Valve Software revolutionized VR gameplay by integrating highly interactive environments and realistic physics. Similarly, The Walking Dead: Saints & Sinners (2020) by Skydance Production utilizes physics-based combat and decision-driven storytelling to enhance immersion.

== Ethical and social implications ==
Virtual reality fiction is often a means of exploring ethical concerns, such as digital addiction, identity disintegration, and corporate control of virtual worlds. It has been revealed that VR can influence users' perception of reality, as seen in movies like The Matrix (1999) by Lana and Lilly Wachowski, which questions the nature of existence in a virtual world. However, studies have also shown that VR has potential in medicine, illustrating parallels between fiction and its daily applications, particularly in therapeutic and training environments. Fiction also tends to examine the social ramifications of VR, with privacy concerns, individual autonomy, and the consequences of excessive reliance on simulated reality. The intersection of such moral issues and technological innovation continues to shape both fictional narrative and real-world discussion about the future of VR.

The Rise of Virtual Reality Concerts and Their Impact on Live Music

== See also ==
- AlloSphere
- Augmented reality
- Haptic technology
- Virtual body
- Virtual globe
- Virtual machining
- Virtual taste
