= Virtual reality =

Computer-simulated experience

External videos
- Virtual Reality, Computer Chronicles (1992)

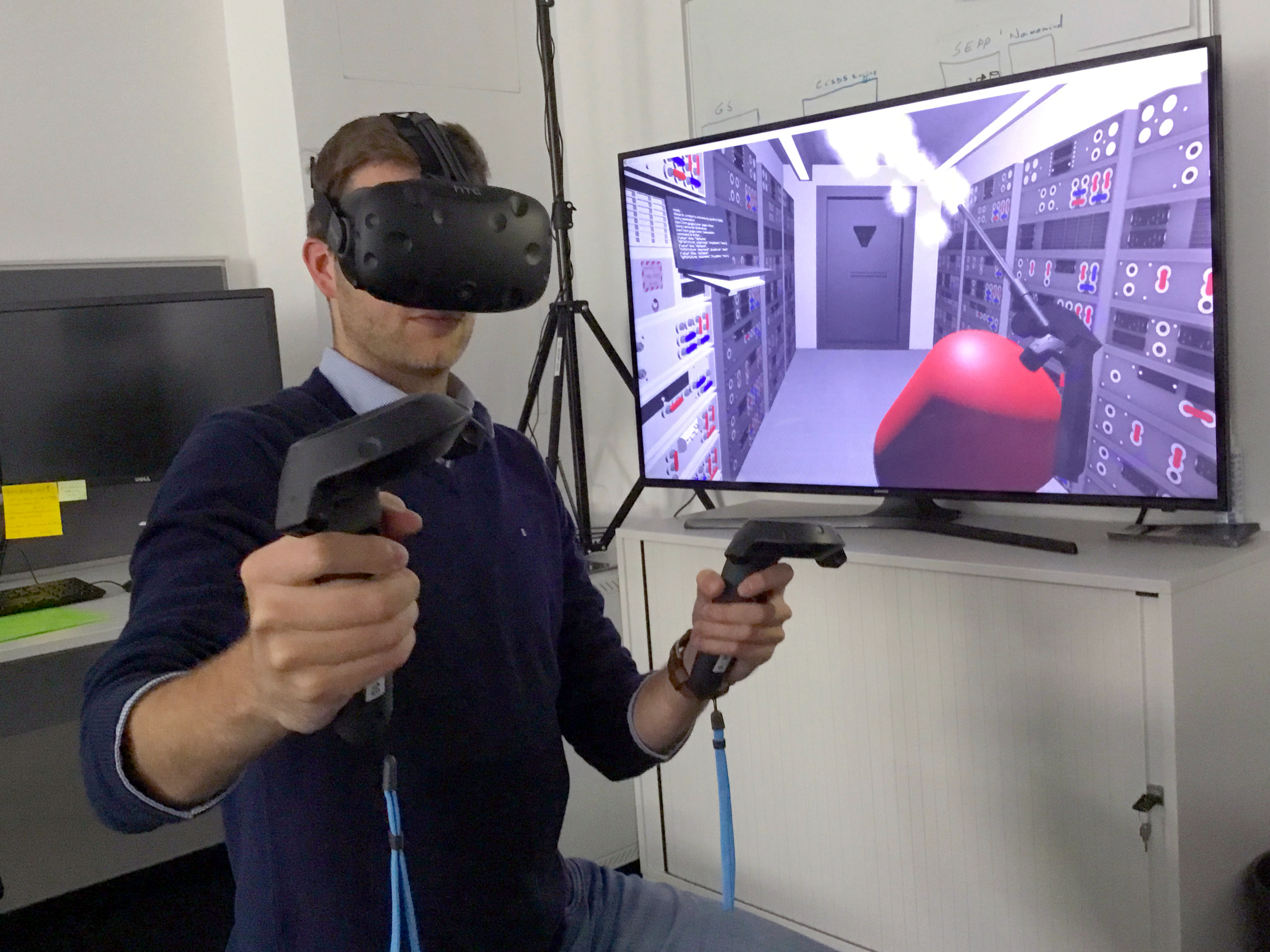
Researchers with the European Space Agency in Darmstadt, Germany, equipped with a VR headset and motion controllers, demonstrating how astronauts might use virtual reality in the future to train to extinguish a fire inside a lunar habitat

Virtual reality (VR) is a simulated experience that employs 3D head-mounted displays and pose tracking to give the user an immersive feel of a virtual world. Applications of virtual reality include entertainment (particularly video games), education (such as medical, safety, or military training), research and business (such as virtual meetings).

Currently, standard virtual reality systems use either virtual reality headsets or multi-projected environments to generate some realistic images, sounds, and other sensations that simulate a user's physical presence in a virtual environment. A person using virtual reality equipment is able to look around the artificial world, move around in it, and interact with virtual features or items. The effect is commonly created by VR headsets consisting of a head-mounted display with a small screen in front of the eyes but can also be created through specially designed rooms with multiple large screens. Virtual reality typically incorporates auditory and video feedback but may also allow other types of sensory and force feedback through haptic technology.

VR is one of the key technologies in the reality-virtuality continuum. As such, it is different from other digital visualization solutions, such as augmented virtuality and augmented reality.

== Etymology ==
"Virtual" has had the meaning of "being something in essence or effect, though not actually or in fact" since the mid-1400s. The term "virtual" has been used in the computer sense of "not physically existing but made to appear by software" since 1959.

In 1938, French avant-garde playwright Antonin Artaud described the illusory nature of characters and objects in the theatre as "la réalité virtuelle" in a collection of essays, Le Théâtre et son double. The English translation of this book, published in 1958 as The Theater and its Double, is the earliest published use of the term "virtual reality". The term "artificial reality", coined by Myron Krueger, has been in use since the 1970s. The term English term "virtual reality" was used in a 1982 novel by Damien Broderick, The Judas Mandala. The first use of the term in the modern sense given in the Oxford English Dictionary dates to 1979, in an announcement from IBM.

Widespread adoption of the term "virtual reality" in the popular media is attributed to Jaron Lanier, who in the late 1980s designed some of the first business-grade virtual reality hardware under his firm VPL Research, and the 1992 film Lawnmower Man, which features use of virtual reality systems.

== Forms and methods ==
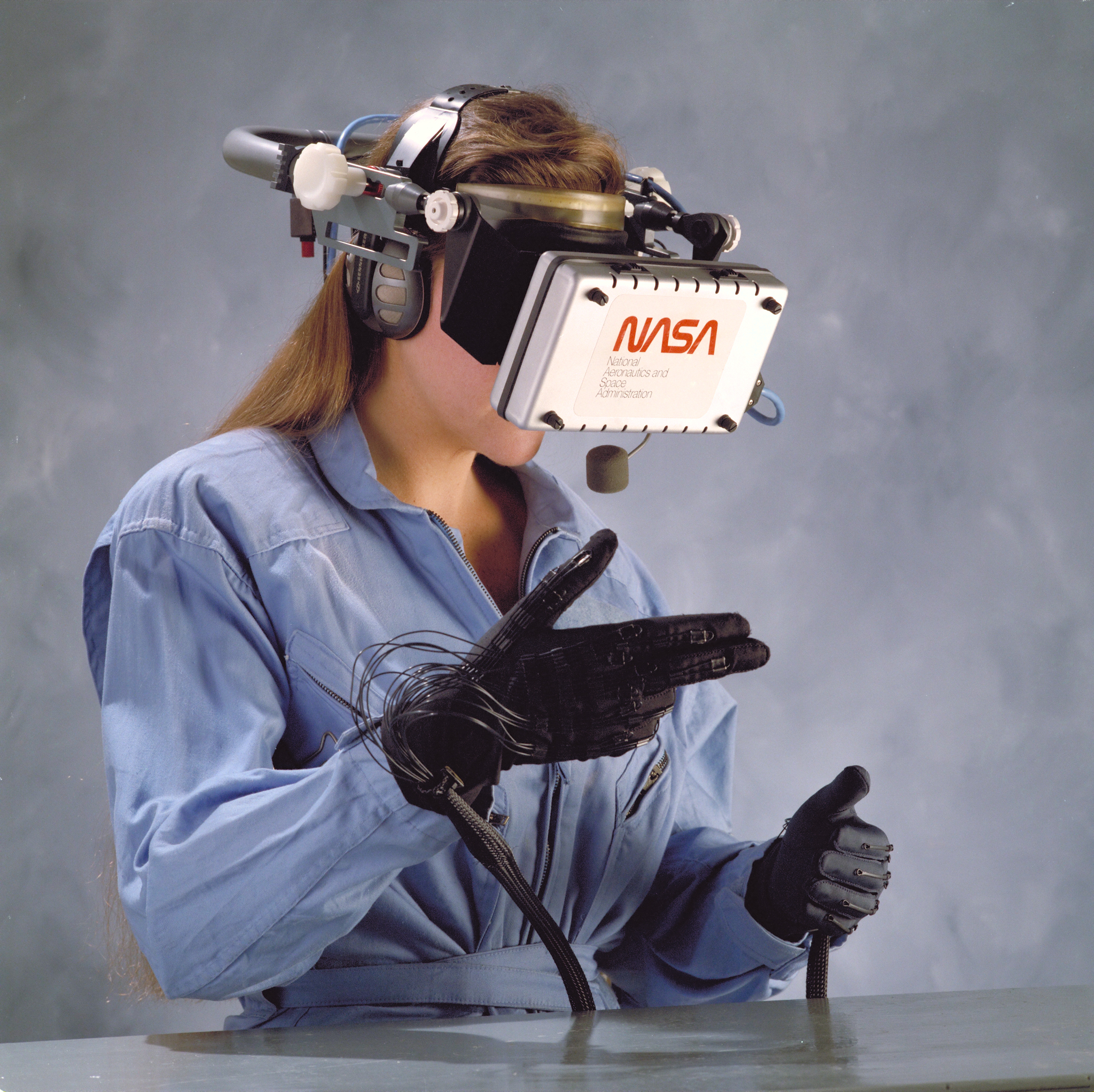
An operator controlling The Virtual Interface Environment Workstation (VIEW) at NASA Ames around 1990

One method of realizing virtual reality is through simulation-based virtual reality. For example, driving simulators give the driver the impression of actually driving a vehicle by predicting vehicular motion based on the driver's input and providing corresponding visual, motion, and audio cues.

With avatar image-based virtual reality, people can join the virtual environment in the form of real video as well as an avatar. One can participate in the 3D distributed virtual environment in the form of either a conventional avatar or a real video. Users can select their own type of participation based on the system capability.

In projector-based virtual reality, modeling of the real environment plays a vital role in various virtual reality applications, including robot navigation, construction modeling, and airplane simulation. Image-based virtual reality systems have been gaining popularity in computer graphics and computer vision communities. In generating realistic models, it is essential to accurately register acquired 3D data; usually, a camera is used for modeling small objects at a short distance.

Desktop-based virtual reality involves displaying a 3D virtual world on a regular desktop display without use of any specialized VR positional tracking equipment. Many modern first-person video games can be used as an example, using various triggers, responsive characters, and other such interactive devices to make the user feel as though they are in a virtual world. A common criticism of this form of immersion is that there is no sense of peripheral vision, limiting the user's ability to know what is happening around them.

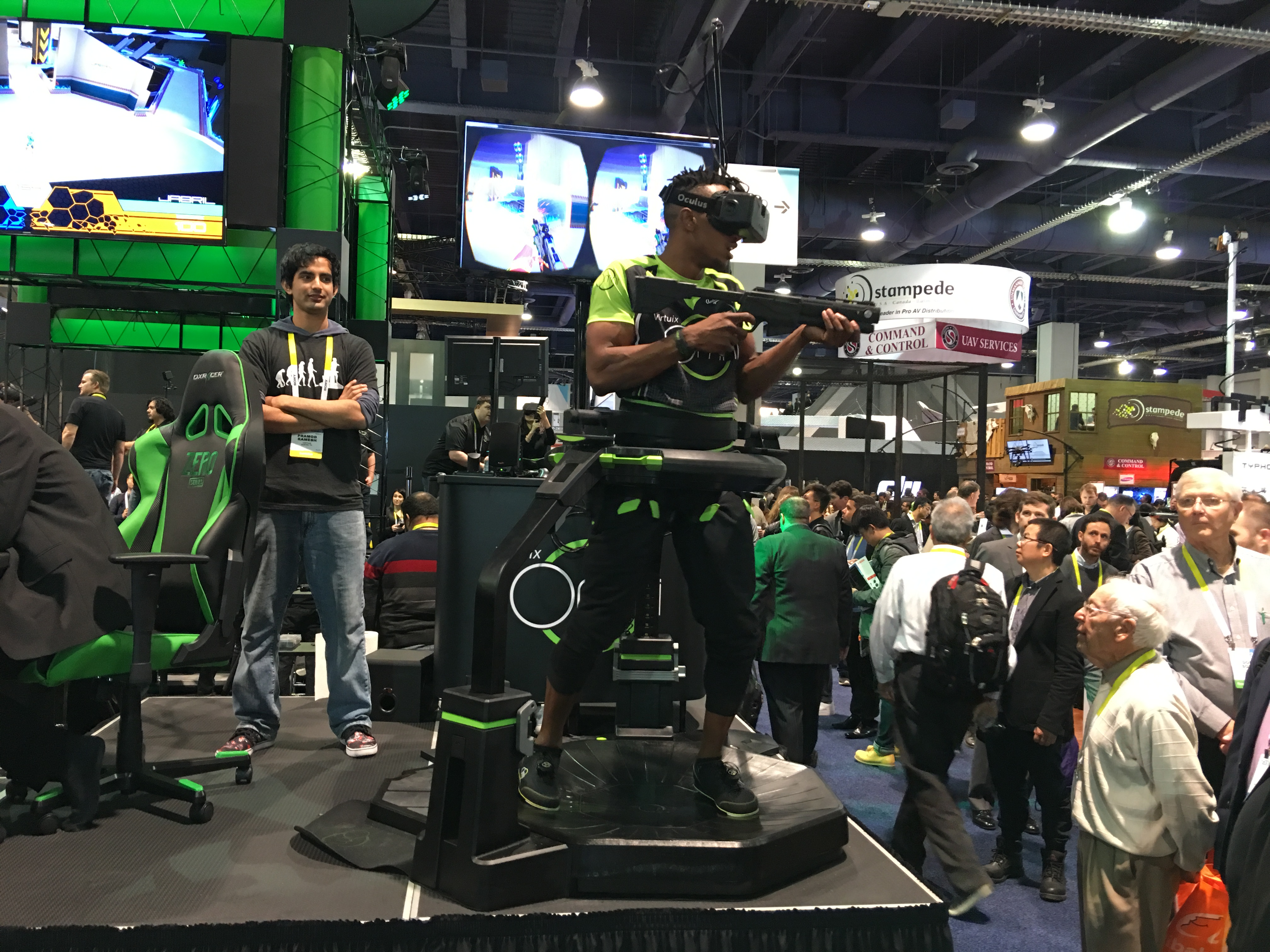
An Omni treadmill being used at a VR convention

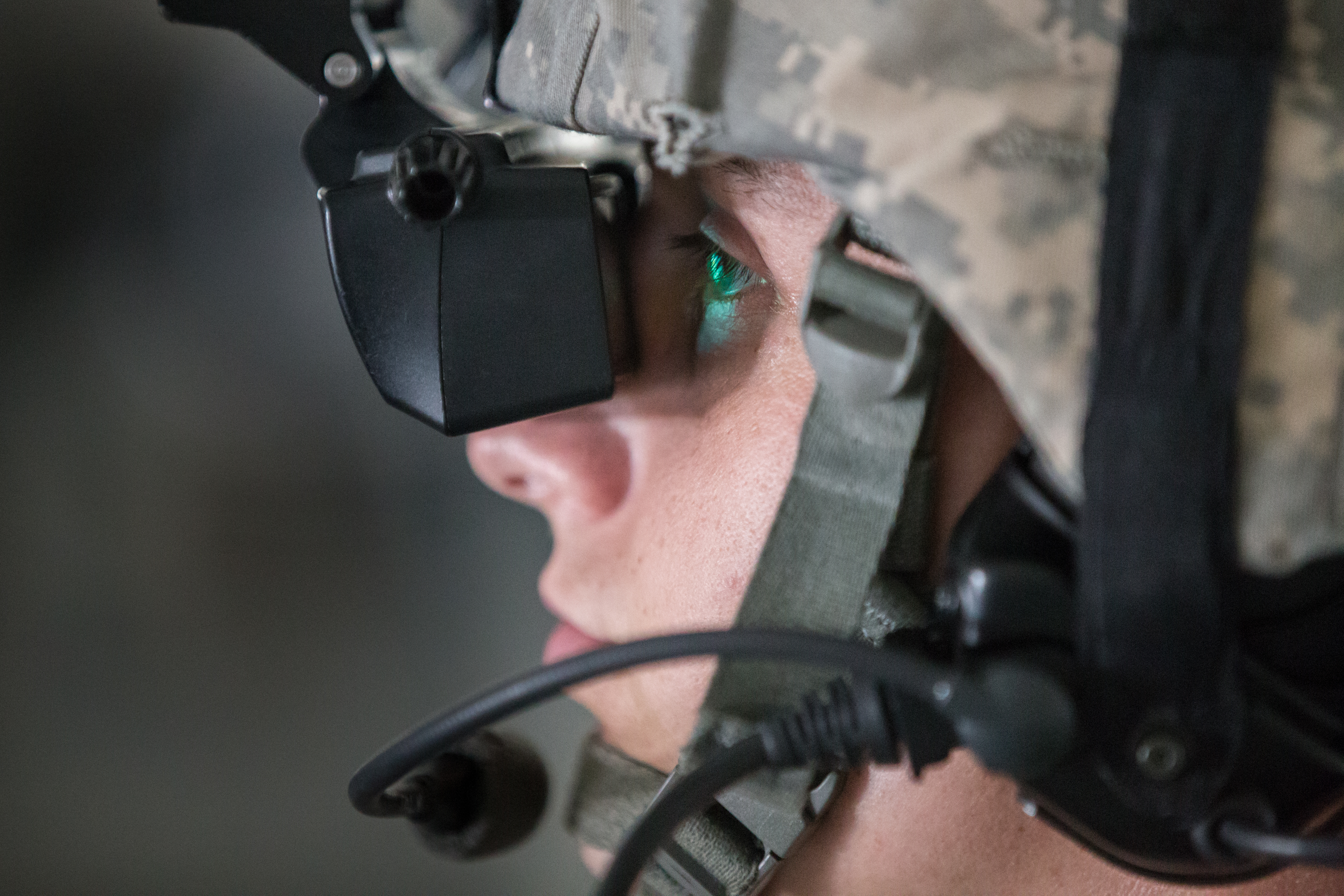
A Missouri National Guardsman looks into a VR training head-mounted display at Fort Leonard Wood in 2015.

A head-mounted display (HMD) more fully immerses the user in a virtual world. A virtual reality headset typically includes two small high resolution OLED or LCD monitors which provide separate images for each eye for stereoscopic graphics rendering a 3D virtual world, a binaural audio system, positional and rotational real-time head tracking for six degrees of movement. Options include motion controls with haptic feedback for physically interacting within the virtual world in an intuitive way with little to no abstraction and an omnidirectional treadmill for more freedom of physical movement allowing the user to perform locomotive motion in any direction.

Augmented reality (AR) is a type of virtual reality technology that blends what the user sees in their real surroundings with digital content generated by computer software. The additional software-generated images with the virtual scene typically enhance how the real surroundings look in some way. AR systems layer virtual information over a camera live feed into a headset or smartglasses or through a mobile device giving the user the ability to view three-dimensional images.

Mixed reality (MR) is the merging of the real world and virtual worlds to produce new environments and visualizations where physical and digital objects co-exist and interact in real time.

A cyberspace is sometimes defined as a networked virtual reality.

Simulated reality is a hypothetical virtual reality as truly immersive as the actual reality, enabling an advanced lifelike experience or even virtual eternity.

== History ==
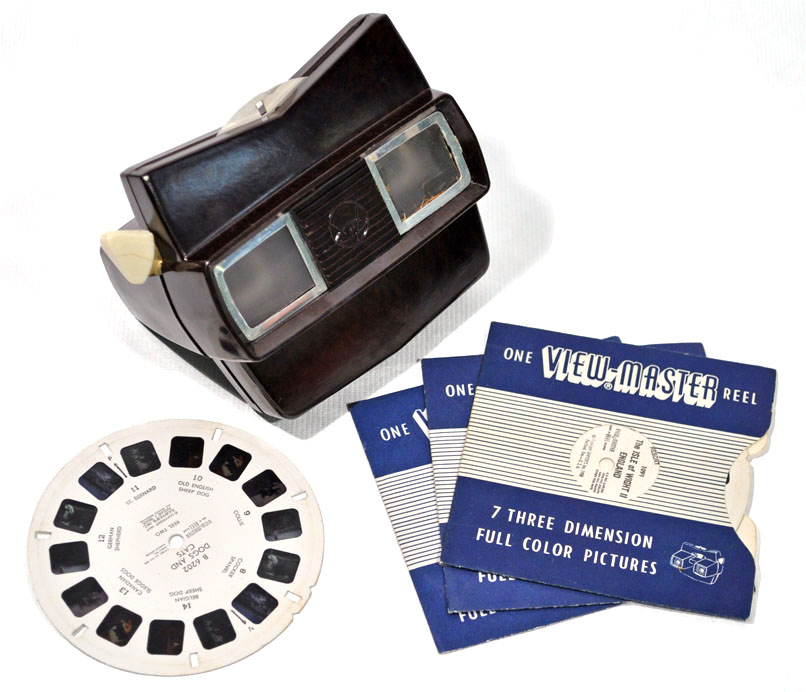
View-Master, a stereoscopic visual simulator, was introduced in 1939.

The development of perspective in Renaissance European art and the stereoscope invented by Sir Charles Wheatstone were both precursors to virtual reality. The first references to the more modern-day concept of virtual reality came from science fiction.

=== 20th century ===
Morton Heilig wrote in the 1950s of an "Experience Theatre" that could encompass all the senses in an effective manner, thus drawing the viewer into the onscreen activity. He built a prototype of his vision dubbed the Sensorama in 1962, along with five short films to be displayed in it while engaging multiple senses (sight, sound, smell, and touch). Predating digital computing, the Sensorama was a mechanical device. Heilig also developed what he referred to as the "Telesphere Mask" (patented in 1960). The patent application described the device as "a telescopic television apparatus for individual use... The spectator is given a complete sensation of reality, i.e., moving three-dimensional images that may be in color, with 100% peripheral vision, binaural sound, scents, and air breezes."

In 1968, Harvard Professor Ivan Sutherland, with the help of his students, including Bob Sproull, created what was widely considered to be the first head-mounted display system for use in immersive simulation applications, called The Sword of Damocles. It was primitive both in terms of user interface and visual realism, and the HMD to be worn by the user was so heavy that it had to be suspended from the ceiling, which gave the device a formidable appearance and inspired its name. Technically, the device was an augmented reality device due to optical passthrough. The graphics comprising the virtual environment were simple wire-frame model rooms.

==== 1970–1990 ====
The virtual reality industry mainly provided VR devices for medical, flight simulation, automobile industry design, and military training purposes from 1970 to 1990.

David Em became the first artist to produce navigable virtual worlds at NASA's Jet Propulsion Laboratory (JPL) from 1977 to 1984. The Aspen Movie Map, a crude virtual tour in which users could wander the streets of Aspen in one of the three modes (summer, winter, and polygons), was created at MIT in 1978.

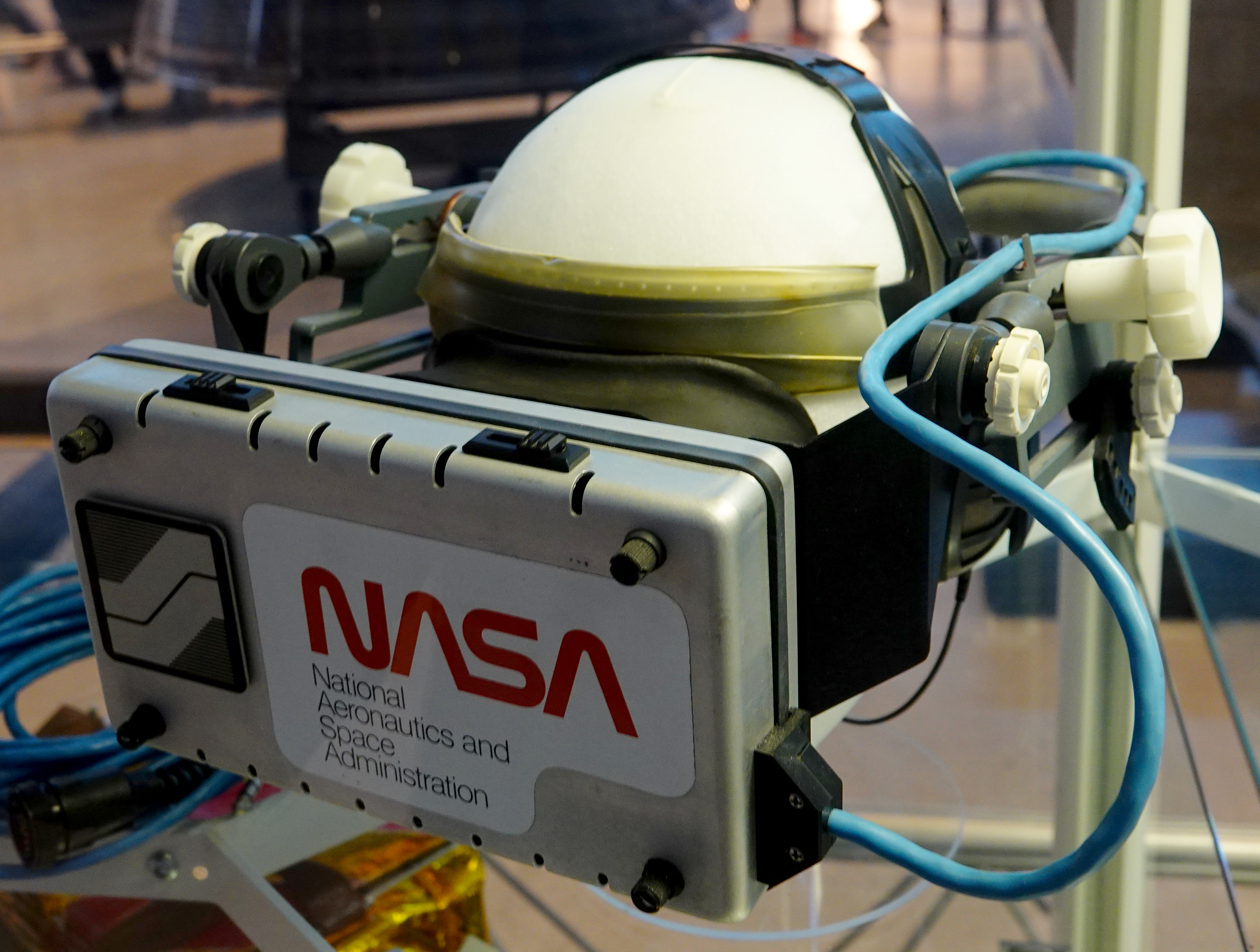
NASA Ames's 1985 VIEW headset

In 1979, Eric Howlett developed the Large Expanse, Extra Perspective (LEEP) optical system. The combined system created a stereoscopic image with a field-of-view wide enough to create a convincing sense of space. The users of the system have been impressed by the sensation of depth (field of view) in the scene and the corresponding realism. The original LEEP system was redesigned for NASA's Ames Research Center in 1985 for their first virtual reality installation, the VIEW (Virtual Interactive Environment Workstation) by Scott Fisher. The LEEP system provided the basis for most of the early virtual reality headsets.

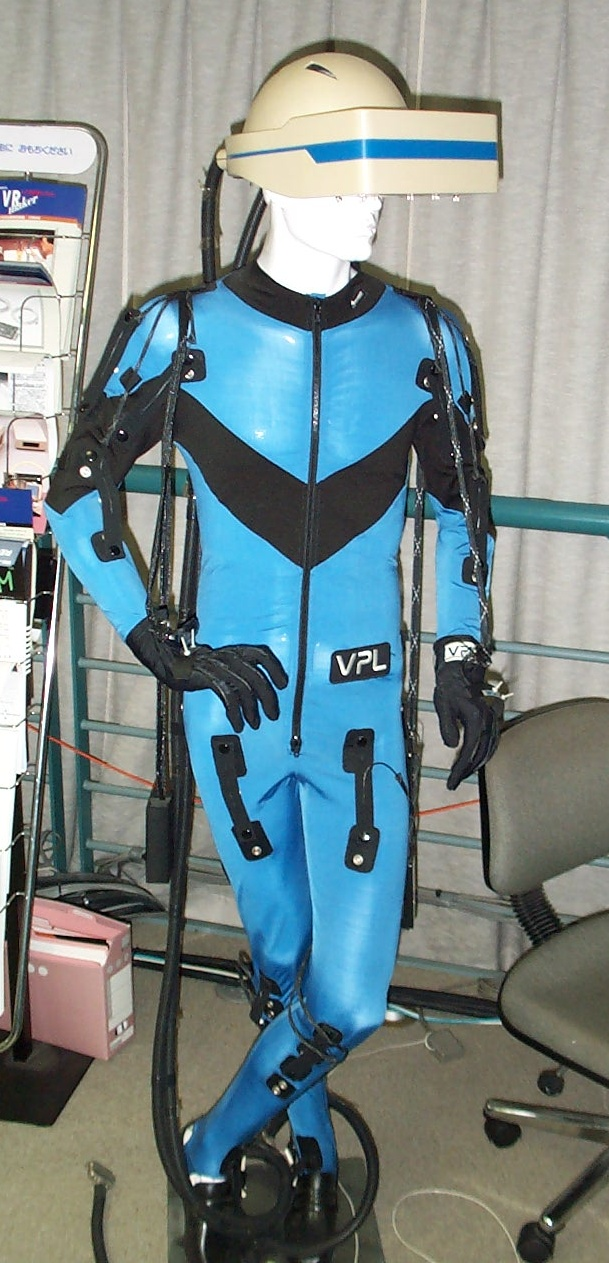
A VPL Research DataSuit, a full-body outfit with sensors for measuring the movement of arms, legs, and trunk. Developed c. 1989. Displayed at the Nissho Iwai showroom in Tokyo

By the late 1980s, the term "virtual reality" was popularized by Jaron Lanier, one of the modern pioneers of the field. Lanier had founded the company VPL Research in 1984. VPL Research has developed several VR devices like the DataGlove, the EyePhone, the Reality Built For Two (RB2), and the AudioSphere. VPL licensed the DataGlove technology to Mattel, which used it to make the Power Glove, an early affordable VR device, released in 1989. That same year Broderbund's U-Force was released.

Atari, Inc. founded a research lab for virtual reality in 1982, but the lab was closed after two years due to the video game crash of 1983. However, its hired employees, such as Scott Fisher, Michael Naimark, and Brenda Laurel, kept their research and development on VR-related technologies.

In 1988, the Cyberspace Project at Autodesk was the first to implement VR on a low-cost personal computer. The project leader Eric Gullichsen left in 1990 to found Sense8 Corporation and develop the WorldToolKit virtual reality SDK, which offered the first real time graphics with Texture mapping on a PC, and was widely used throughout industry and academia.

==== 1990–2000 ====
The 1990s saw the first widespread commercial releases of consumer headsets. In 1992, for instance, Computer Gaming World predicted "affordable VR by 1994".

In 1991, Sega announced the Sega VR headset for the Mega Drive home console. It used LCD screens in the visor, stereo headphones, and inertial sensors that allowed the system to track and react to the movements of the user's head. In the same year, Virtuality launched and went on to become the first mass-produced, networked, multiplayer VR entertainment system that was released in many countries, including a dedicated VR arcade at Embarcadero Center. Costing up to $73,000 per multi-pod Virtuality system, they featured headsets and exoskeleton gloves that gave one of the first "immersive" VR experiences.

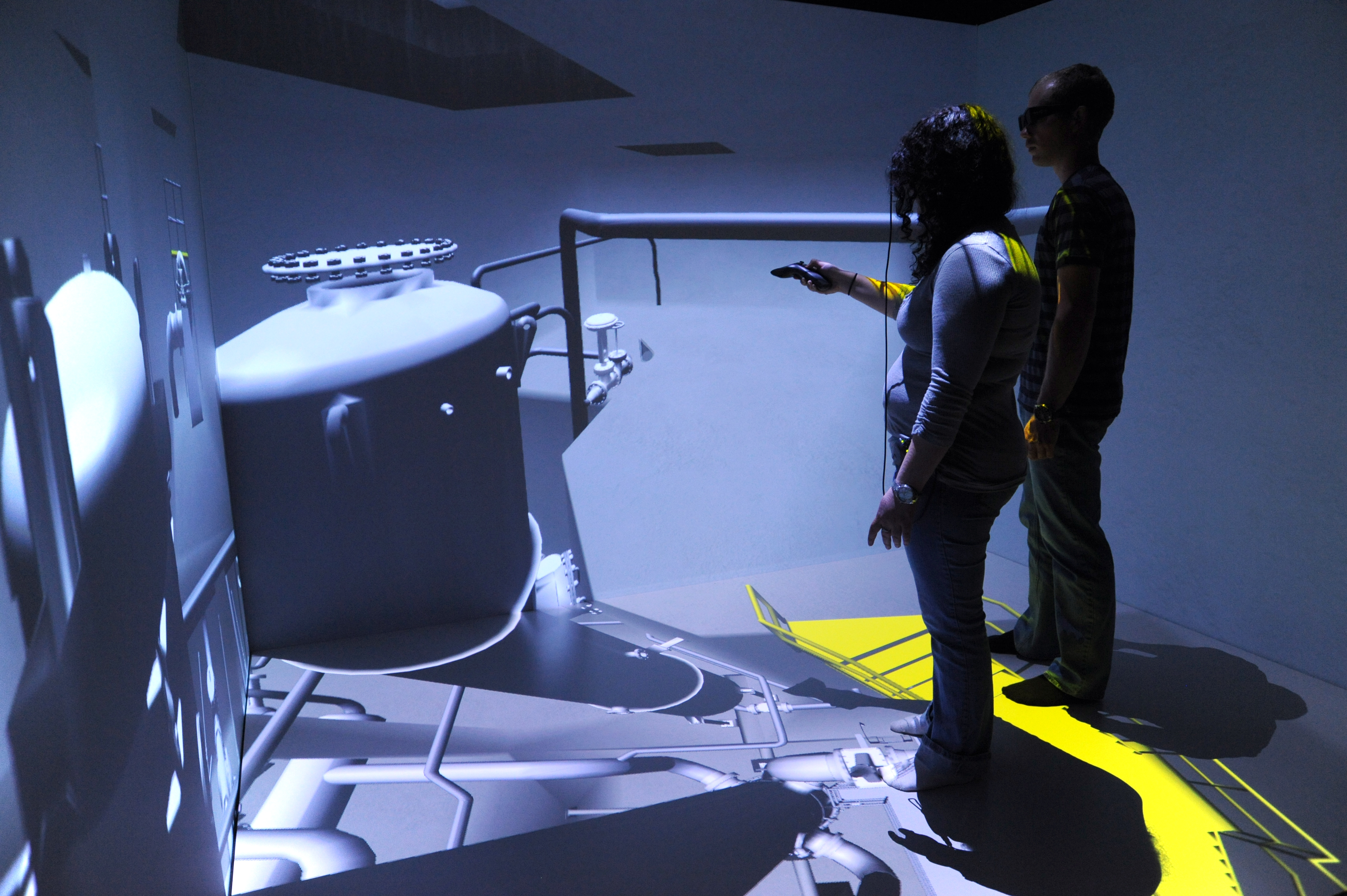
A CAVE system at IDL's Center for Advanced Energy Studies in 2010

That same year, Carolina Cruz-Neira, Daniel J. Sandin, and Thomas A. DeFanti from the Electronic Visualization Laboratory created the first cubic immersive room, the Cave automatic virtual environment (CAVE). Developed as Cruz-Neira's PhD thesis, it involved a multi-projected environment, similar to the holodeck, allowing people to see their own bodies in relation to others in the room. Antonio Medina, an MIT graduate and NASA scientist, designed a virtual reality system to "drive" Mars rovers from Earth in apparent real time despite the substantial delay of Mars-Earth-Mars signals.

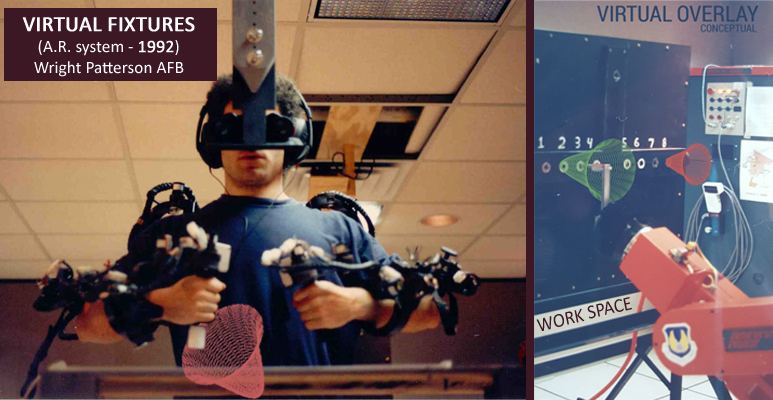
Virtual Fixtures immersive AR system developed in 1992. Picture features Dr. Louis Rosenberg interacting freely in 3D with overlaid virtual objects called 'fixtures'.

In 1992, Nicole Stenger created Angels, the first real-time interactive immersive movie where the interaction was facilitated with a dataglove and high-resolution goggles. That same year, Louis Rosenberg created the virtual fixtures system at the U.S. Air Force's Armstrong Labs using a full upper-body exoskeleton, enabling a physically realistic mixed reality in 3D. The system enabled the overlay of physically real 3D virtual objects registered with a user's direct view of the real world, producing the first true augmented reality experience enabling sight, sound, and touch.

By July 1994, Sega had released the VR-1 motion simulator ride attraction in Joypolis indoor theme parks, as well as the Dennou Senki Net Merc arcade game. Both used an advanced head-mounted display dubbed the "Mega Visor Display" developed in conjunction with Virtuality; it was able to track head movement in a 360-degree stereoscopic 3D environment, and in its Net Merc incarnation was powered by the Sega Model 1 arcade system board. Apple released QuickTime VR, which, despite using the term "VR", was unable to represent virtual reality, and instead displayed 360-degree interactive panoramas.

Nintendo's Virtual Boy console was released in 1995. A group in Seattle created public demonstrations of a "CAVE-like" 270 degree immersive projection room called the Virtual Environment Theater, produced by entrepreneurs Chet Dagit and Bob Jacobson. Forte released the VFX1, a PC-powered virtual reality headset that same year.

In 1999, entrepreneur Philip Rosedale formed Linden Lab with an initial focus on the development of VR hardware. In its earliest form, the company struggled to produce a commercial version of "The Rig", which was realized in prototype form as a clunky steel contraption with several computer monitors that users could wear on their shoulders. The concept was later adapted into the personal computer-based, 3D virtual world program Second Life.

=== 21st century ===
==== 2000–2010 ====
The 2000s decade was a period of relative public and investment indifference to commercially available VR technologies.

In 2001, SAS Cube (SAS3) became the first PC-based cubic room, developed by Z-A Production (Maurice Benayoun, David Nahon), Barco, and Clarté. It was installed in Laval, France. The SAS library gave birth to Virtools VRPack. In 2007, Google introduced Street View, a service that shows panoramic views of an increasing number of worldwide positions such as roads, indoor buildings and rural areas. It also features a stereoscopic 3D mode, introduced in 2010.

==== 2010–present ====
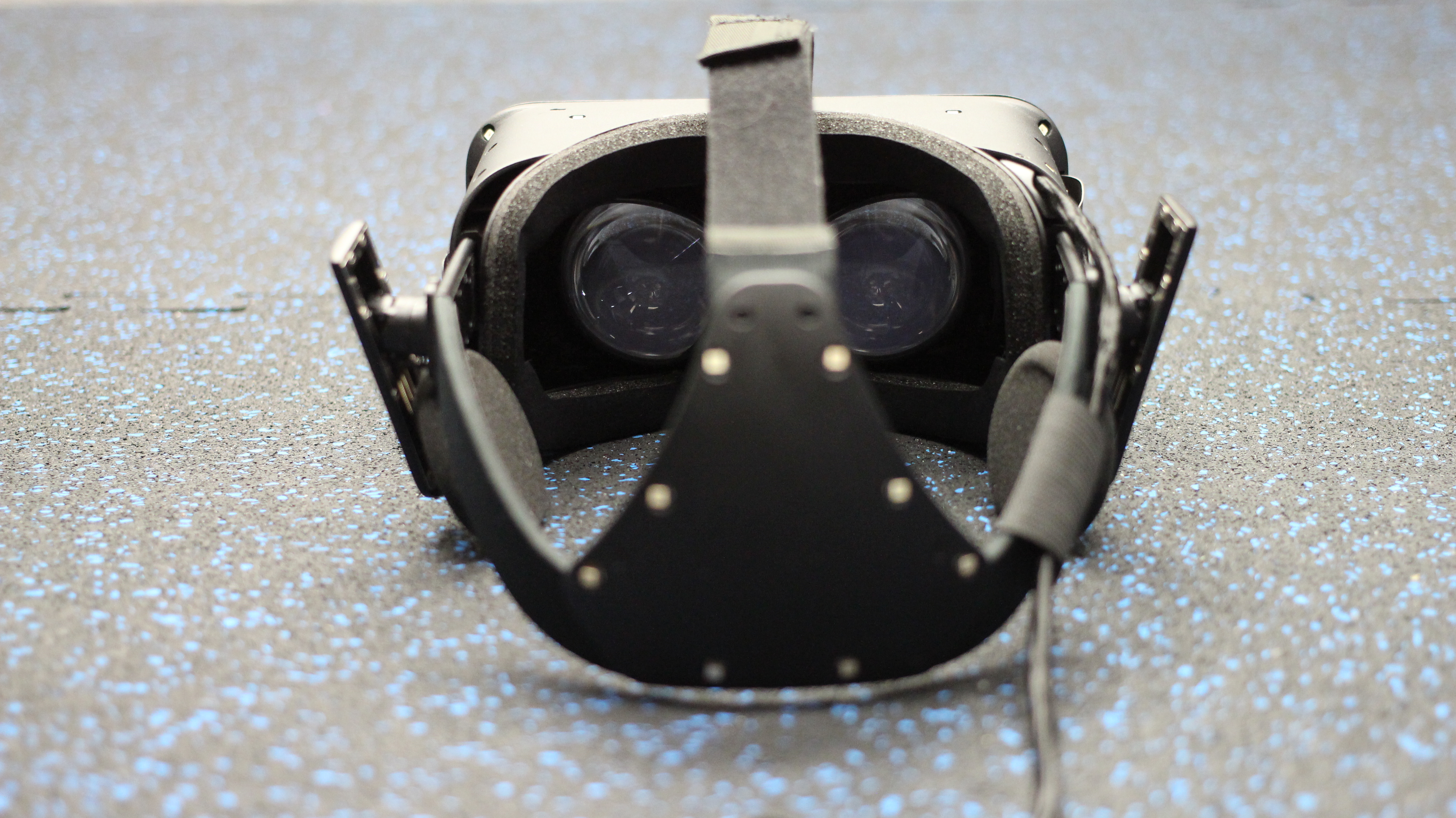
An inside view of the Oculus Rift Crescent Bay prototype headset

In 2010, Palmer Luckey designed the first prototype of the Oculus Rift. This prototype, built on a shell of another virtual reality headset, was only capable of rotational tracking. However, it boasted a 90-degree field of vision that was previously unseen in the consumer market at the time. Luckey eliminated distortion issues arising from the type of lens used to create the wide field of vision using software that pre-distorted the rendered image in real-time. This initial design would later serve as a basis from which the later designs came. In 2012, the Rift was presented for the first time at the E3 video game trade show by John Carmack. In 2014, Facebook (later Meta) purchased Oculus VR for what at the time was stated as $2 billion but later revealed that the more accurate figure was $3 billion. This purchase occurred after the first development kits ordered through Oculus' 2012 Kickstarter had shipped in 2013 but before the shipping of their second development kits in 2014. ZeniMax, Carmack's former employer, sued Oculus and Facebook for taking company secrets to Facebook; the verdict was in favor of ZeniMax, settled out of court later.

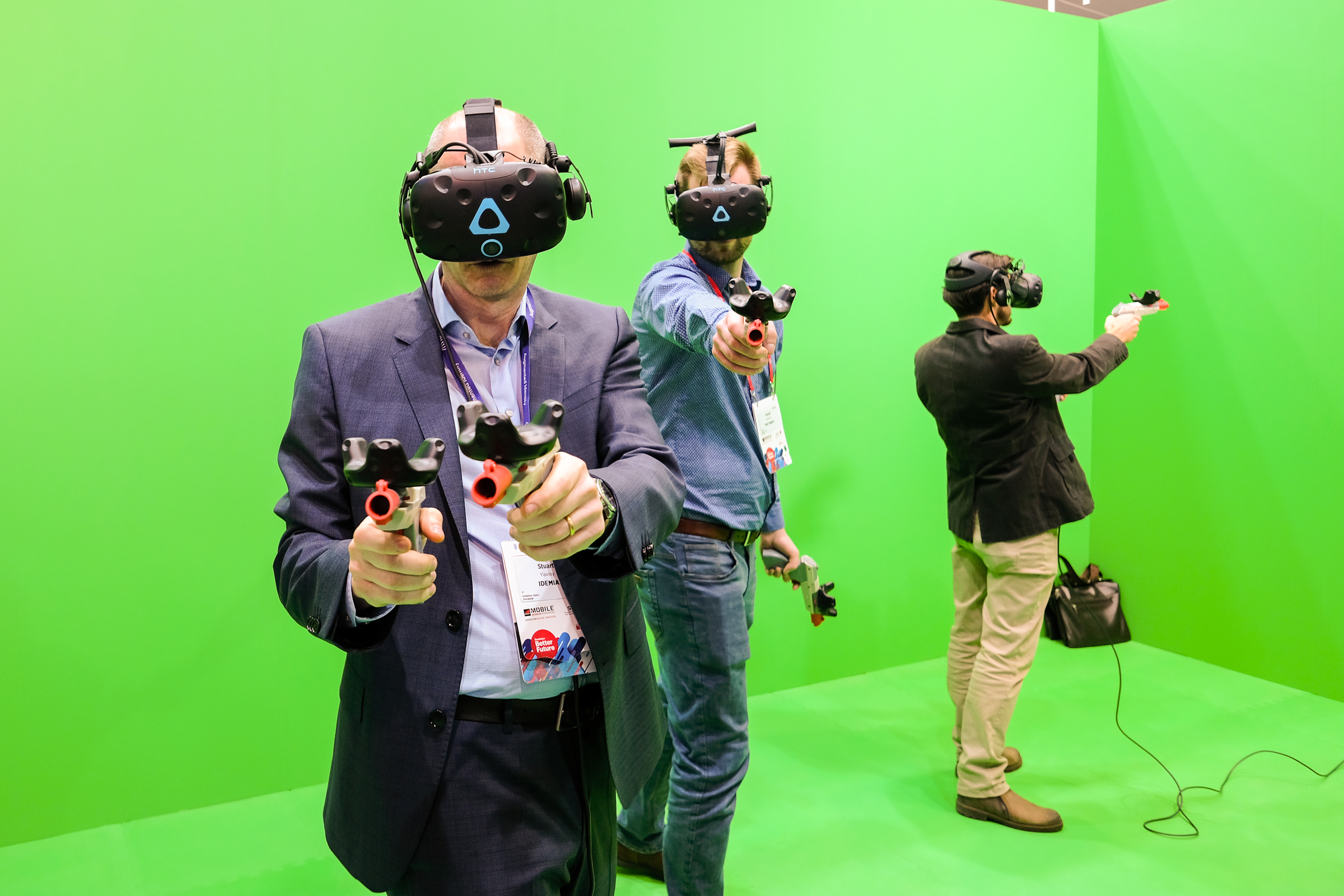
HTC Vive headsets worn at Mobile World Congress 2018

In 2013, Valve discovered and freely shared the breakthrough of low-persistence displays which make lag-free and smear-free display of VR content possible. This was adopted by Oculus and was used in all their future headsets. In early 2014, Valve showed off their SteamSight prototype, the precursor to both consumer headsets released in 2016. It shared major features with the consumer headsets including separate 1K displays per eye, low persistence, positional tracking over a large area, and Fresnel lenses. HTC and Valve announced the virtual reality headset HTC Vive and controllers in 2015. The set included tracking technology called Lighthouse, which utilized wall-mounted "base stations" for positional tracking using infrared light.

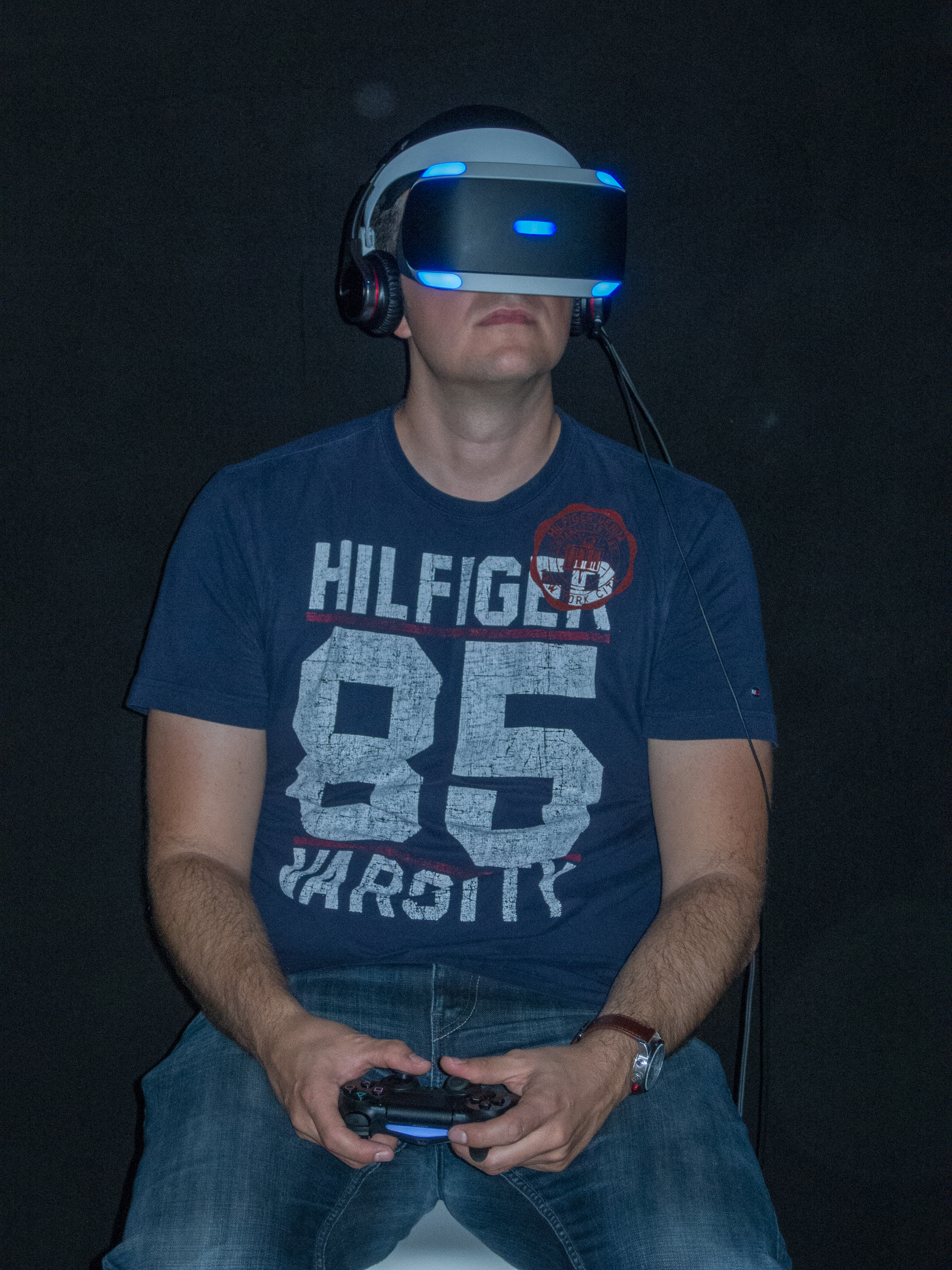
The Project Morpheus (PlayStation VR) headset worn at Gamescom 2015

In 2014, Sony announced Project Morpheus (its code name for the PlayStation VR), a virtual reality headset for the PlayStation 4 video game console. The Chinese headset AntVR was released in late 2014; it was briefly competitive in the Chinese market but ultimately unable to compete with the larger technology companies. In 2015, Google announced Cardboard, a do-it-yourself stereoscopic viewer: the user places their smartphone in the cardboard holder, which they wear on their head. Michael Naimark was appointed Google's first-ever 'resident artist' in their new VR division. The Kickstarter campaign for Gloveone, a pair of gloves providing motion tracking and haptic feedback, was successfully funded, with over $150,000 in contributions. Also in 2015, Razer unveiled its open source project OSVR.

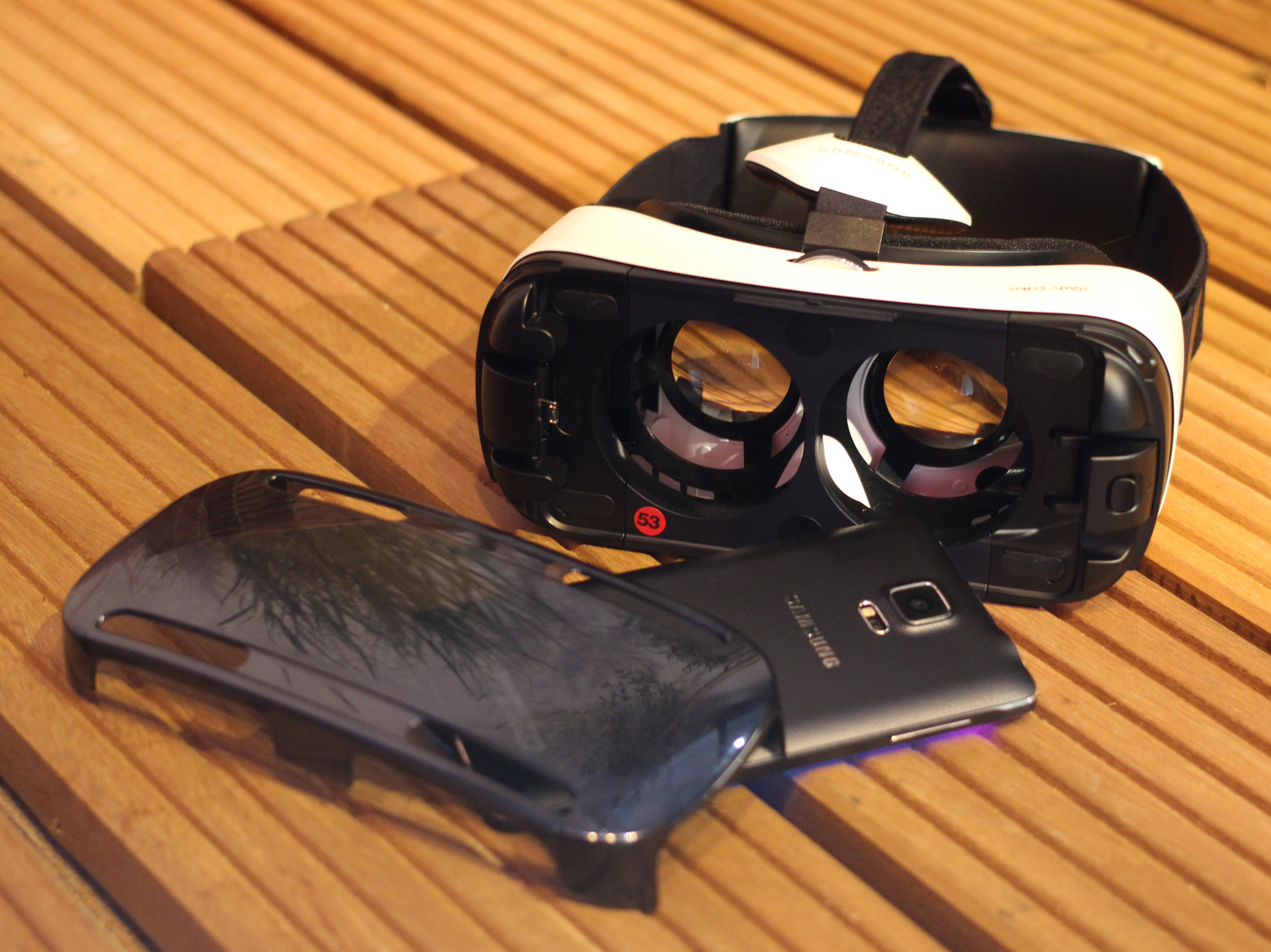
Smartphone-based budget headset Samsung Gear VR in dismantled state

By 2016, there were at least 230 companies developing VR-related products. Amazon, Apple, Facebook, Google, Microsoft, Sony and Samsung all had dedicated AR and VR groups. Dynamic binaural audio was common to most headsets released that year. However, haptic interfaces were not well developed, and most hardware packages incorporated button-operated handsets for touch-based interactivity. Visually, displays were still of a low-enough resolution and frame rate that images were still identifiable as virtual.

In 2016, HTC shipped its first units of the HTC Vive SteamVR headset. This marked the first major commercial release of sensor-based tracking, allowing for free movement of users within a defined space. A patent filed by Sony in 2017 showed they were developing a similar location tracking technology to the Vive for PlayStation VR, with the potential for the development of a wireless headset.

In 2019, Oculus released the Oculus Rift S and a standalone headset, the Oculus Quest. These headsets utilized inside-out tracking compared to external outside-in tracking seen in previous generations of headsets.

Later in 2019, Valve released the Valve Index. Notable features include a 130° field of view, off-ear headphones for immersion and comfort, open-handed controllers which allow for individual finger tracking, front facing cameras, and a front expansion slot meant for extensibility.

In 2020, Oculus released the Oculus Quest 2, later renamed the Meta Quest 2. Some new features include a sharper screen, reduced price, and increased performance. Facebook (which became Meta a year later) initially required users to log in with a Facebook account in order to use the new headset. In 2021 the Oculus Quest 2 accounted for 80% of all VR headsets sold.

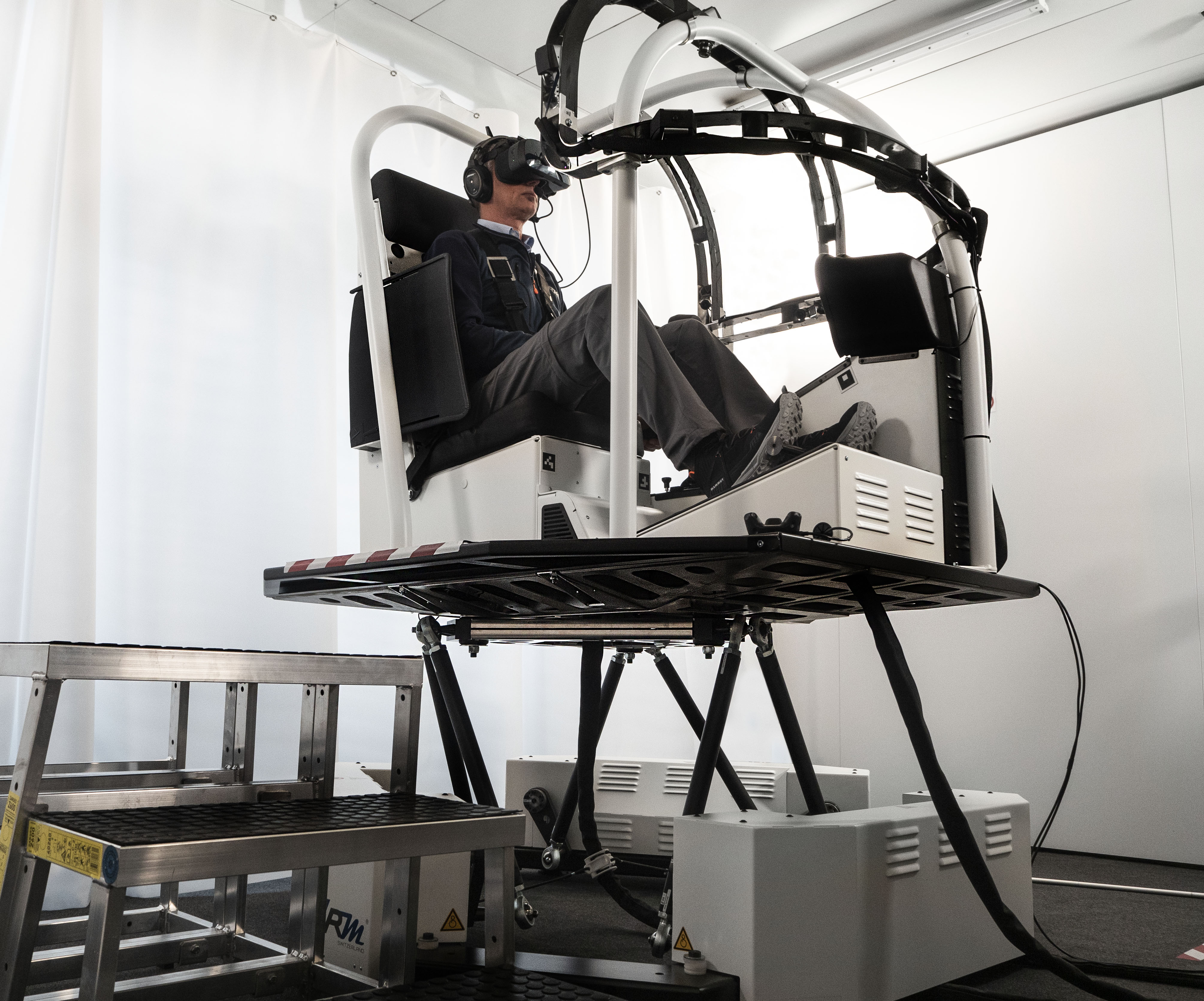
Robinson R22 Virtual Reality Training Device developed by Loft Dynamics

In 2021, EASA approved the first Virtual Reality-based Flight Simulation Training Device. The device, made by Loft Dynamics for rotorcraft pilots, enhances safety by opening up the possibility of practicing risky maneuvers in a virtual environment. This addresses a key risk area in rotorcraft operations, where statistics show that around 20% of accidents occur during training flights.

In 2022, Meta released the Meta Quest Pro. This device utilised a thinner, visor-like design that was not fully enclosed, and was the first headset by Meta to target mixed reality applications using high-resolution colour video passthrough. It also included integrated face and eye tracking, pancake lenses, and updated Touch Pro controllers with on-board motion tracking.

In 2023, Sony released the PlayStation VR2, a follow-up to their 2016 headset. The device includes inside-out tracking, eye-tracked foveated rendering, higher-resolution OLED displays, controllers with adaptive triggers and haptic feedback, 3D audio, and a wider field of view. While initially exclusive for use with the PlayStation 5 console, a PC adapter was released in August 2024.

Later in 2023, Meta released the Meta Quest 3, the successor to the Quest 2. It features the pancake lenses and mixed reality features of the Quest Pro, as well as an increased field of view and resolution compared to Quest 2. In October 2024 Meta released a lower cost entry headset the Meta Quest 3S with the same fresnel lenses as the Quest 2 and a lower resolution of 1832x1920 as compared to 2064x2208 on the Quest 3.

In 2024, Apple released the Apple Vision Pro. The device is a fully enclosed mixed reality headset that strongly utilises video passthrough. While some VR experiences are available on the device, it lacks standard VR headset features such as external controllers or support for OpenXR and is instead branded as a "spatial computer".

In 2024, the Federal Aviation Administration approved its first virtual reality flight simulation training device: Loft Dynamics' virtual reality Airbus Helicopters H125 FSTD—the same device EASA qualified. As of September 2024, Loft Dynamics remains the only VR FSTD qualified by EASA and the FAA.

== Technology ==
=== Hardware ===
Paramount for the sensation of immersion into virtual reality are a high frame rate and low latency.

Modern virtual reality headset displays are based on technology developed for smartphones including: gyroscopes and motion sensors for tracking head, body, and hand positions; small HD screens for stereoscopic displays; and small, lightweight and fast computer processors. These components led to relative affordability for independent VR developers, and led to the 2012 Oculus Rift Kickstarter offering the first independently developed VR headset.

Independent production of VR images and video has increased alongside the development of affordable omnidirectional cameras, also known as 360-degree cameras or VR cameras, that have the ability to record 360 interactive photography, although at relatively low resolutions or in highly compressed formats for online streaming of 360 video. In contrast, photogrammetry is increasingly used to combine several high-resolution photographs for the creation of detailed 3D objects and environments in VR applications.

To create a feeling of immersion, special output devices are needed to display virtual worlds. Well-known formats include head-mounted displays or the CAVE. In order to convey a spatial impression, two images are generated and displayed from different perspectives (stereo projection). There are different technologies available to bring the respective image to the right eye. A distinction is made between active (e.g., shutter glasses) and passive technologies (e.g. polarizing filters or Infitec).

In order to improve the feeling of immersion, wearable multi-string cables offer haptics to complex geometries in virtual reality. These strings offer fine control of each finger joint to simulate the haptics involved in touching these virtual geometries.

Special input devices are required for interaction with the virtual world. Some of the most common input devices are motion controllers and optical tracking sensors. In some cases, wired gloves are used. Controllers typically use optical tracking systems (primarily infrared cameras) for location and navigation so that the user can move freely without wiring. Some input devices provide the user with force feedback to the hands or other parts of the body so that the user can orientate themselves in the three-dimensional world through haptics and sensor technology as a further sensory sensation and carry out realistic simulations. This allows the viewer to have a sense of direction in the artificial landscape. Additional haptic feedback can be obtained from omnidirectional treadmills (with which walking in virtual space is controlled by real walking movements) and vibration gloves and suits.

Virtual reality cameras can be used to create VR photography using 360-degree panorama videos. VR cameras are available in various formats, with varying numbers of lenses installed in the camera.

=== Software ===
The Virtual Reality Modelling Language (VRML), first introduced in 1994, was intended for the development of "virtual worlds" without dependency on headsets. The Web3D consortium was subsequently founded in 1997 for the development of industry standards for web-based 3D graphics. The consortium subsequently developed X3D from the VRML framework as an archival, open-source standard for web-based distribution of VR content. WebVR is an experimental JavaScript application programming interface (API) that provides support for various virtual reality devices, such as the HTC Vive, Oculus Rift, Google Cardboard or OSVR, in a web browser.

== Visual immersion experience ==
=== Display resolution ===
Minimal Angle of Resolution (MAR) refers to the minimum distance between two display pixels. At a distance, a viewer can clearly distinguish the independent pixels. Often measured in arc-seconds, MAR between two pixels has to do with the viewing distance. For the general public, resolution is about 30–65 arc-seconds, which is referred to as the spatial resolution when combined with distance. Given the viewing distance of 1m and 2m respectively, regular viewers won't be able to perceive two pixels as separate if they are less than 0.29mm apart at 1m and less than 0.58mm apart at 2m.

=== Image latency and display refresh frequency ===
Most small-size displays have a refresh rate of 60 Hz, which adds about 15ms of additional latency. The number is reduced to less than 7ms if the refresh rate is increased to 120 Hz or even 240 Hz and more. Participants generally feel that the experience is more immersive with higher refresh rates as a result. However, higher refresh rates require a more powerful graphics processing unit.

=== Relationship between display and field of view ===
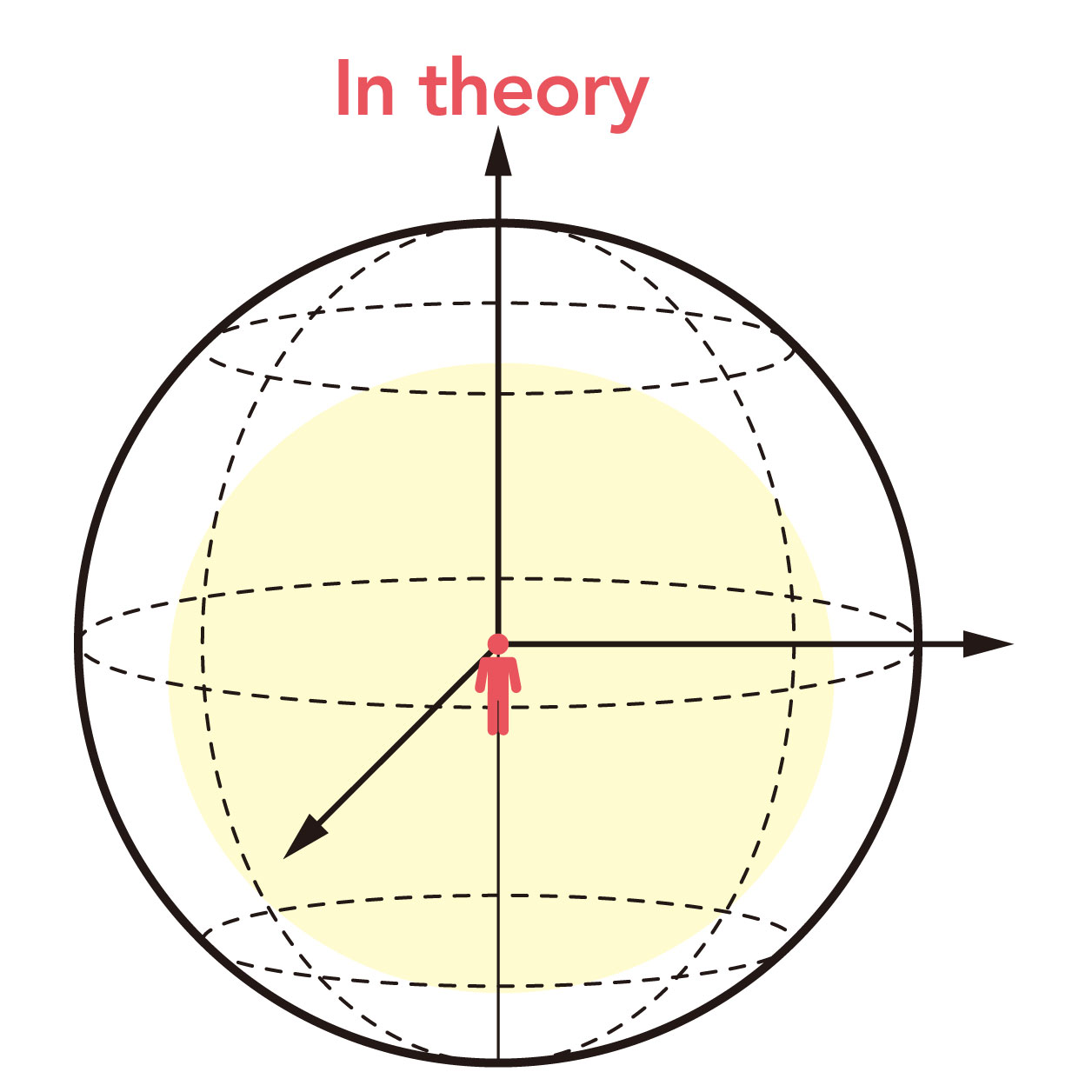
In theory, VR represents a participant's field of view (yellow area).

In assessing the achieved immersion by a VR device, one needs to consider their field of view (FOV) in addition to image quality. Eyes have a horizontal FOV from about 107 or 110 degrees to the temporal side to about 60 or 70 degrees toward the nose and a vertical FOV from about 95 degrees downward to 85 degrees upward, and eye movements are estimated as roughly 30 deg to either side horizontally and 20 vertically. Binocular vision is limited to the 120 or 140 degrees where the right and the left visual fields overlap. With eye movements, we have an FOV of roughly 300 degrees x 175 degrees with two eyes, i.e., approximately one third of the full 360-deg sphere.

== Applications ==
Virtual reality is most commonly used in entertainment applications such as video games, 3D cinema, amusement park rides including dark rides and social virtual worlds. Consumer virtual reality headsets were first released by video game companies in the early-mid 1990s. Beginning in the 2010s, next-generation commercial tethered headsets were released by Oculus (Rift), HTC (Vive) and Sony (PlayStation VR), setting off a new wave of application development. 3D cinema has been used for sporting events, pornography, fine art, music videos and short films. Since 2015, roller coasters and theme parks have incorporated virtual reality to match visual effects with haptic feedback. VR not only fits the trend of the digital industry but also enhances the film's visual effect. The film gives the audience more ways to interact through VR technology.

In social sciences and psychology, virtual reality offers a cost-effective tool to study and replicate interactions in a controlled environment. It can be used as a form of therapeutic intervention. For instance, there is the case of the virtual reality exposure therapy (VRET), a form of exposure therapy for treating anxiety disorders such as post traumatic stress disorder (PTSD) and phobias.

A VR therapy has been designed to help people with psychosis and agoraphobia manage their avoidance of outside environments. In the therapy, the user wears a headset and a virtual character provides psychological advice and guides them as they explore simulated environments (such as a cafe or a busy street). NICE is assessing the therapy to see if it should be recommended on the NHS.

During the COVID-19 pandemic, social VR has also been used as a mental-health tool in a form of self-administered, non-traditional cognitive behavioural therapy.

Virtual reality programs are being used in the rehabilitation processes with elderly individuals that have been diagnosed with Alzheimer's disease. This gives these elderly patients the opportunity to simulate real experiences that they would not otherwise be able to experience due to their current state. 17 recent studies with randomized controlled trials have shown that virtual reality applications are effective in treating cognitive deficits with neurological diagnoses. Loss of mobility in elderly patients can lead to a sense of loneliness and depression. Virtual reality is able to assist in making aging in place a lifeline to an outside world that they cannot easily navigate. Virtual reality allows exposure therapy to take place in a safe environment.

In medicine, simulated VR surgical environments were first developed in the 1990s. Under the supervision of experts, VR can provide effective and repeatable training at a low cost, allowing trainees to recognize and amend errors as they occur.

Virtual reality has been used in physical rehabilitation since the 2000s. Despite numerous studies conducted, good quality evidence of its efficacy compared to other rehabilitation methods without sophisticated and expensive equipment is lacking for the treatment of Parkinson's disease. A 2018 review on the effectiveness of mirror therapy by virtual reality and robotics for any type of pathology concluded in a similar way. Another study was conducted that showed the potential for VR to promote mimicry and revealed the difference between non-autistic and autistic individuals in their response to a two-dimensional avatar.

Immersive virtual reality technology with myoelectric and motion tracking control may represent a possible therapy option for treatment-resistant phantom limb pain. Pain scale measurements were taken into account and an interactive 3-D kitchen environment was developed based on the principles of mirror therapy to allow for control of virtual hands while wearing a motion-tracked VR headset. A systematic search in Pubmed and Embase was performed to determine results that were pooled in two meta-analysis. Meta-analysis showed a significant result in favor of VRT for balance.

In the fast-paced and globalised business world, meetings in VR are used to create an environment in which interactions with other people (e.g. colleagues, customers, partners) can feel more natural than a phone call or video chat. In the customisable meeting rooms all parties can join using the VR headset and interact as if they are in the same physical room. Presentations, videos or 3D models (of e.g. products or prototypes) can be uploaded and interacted with. Compared to traditional text-based CMC, Avatar-based interactions in 3D virtual environment lead to higher levels of consensus, satisfaction, and cohesion among group members.

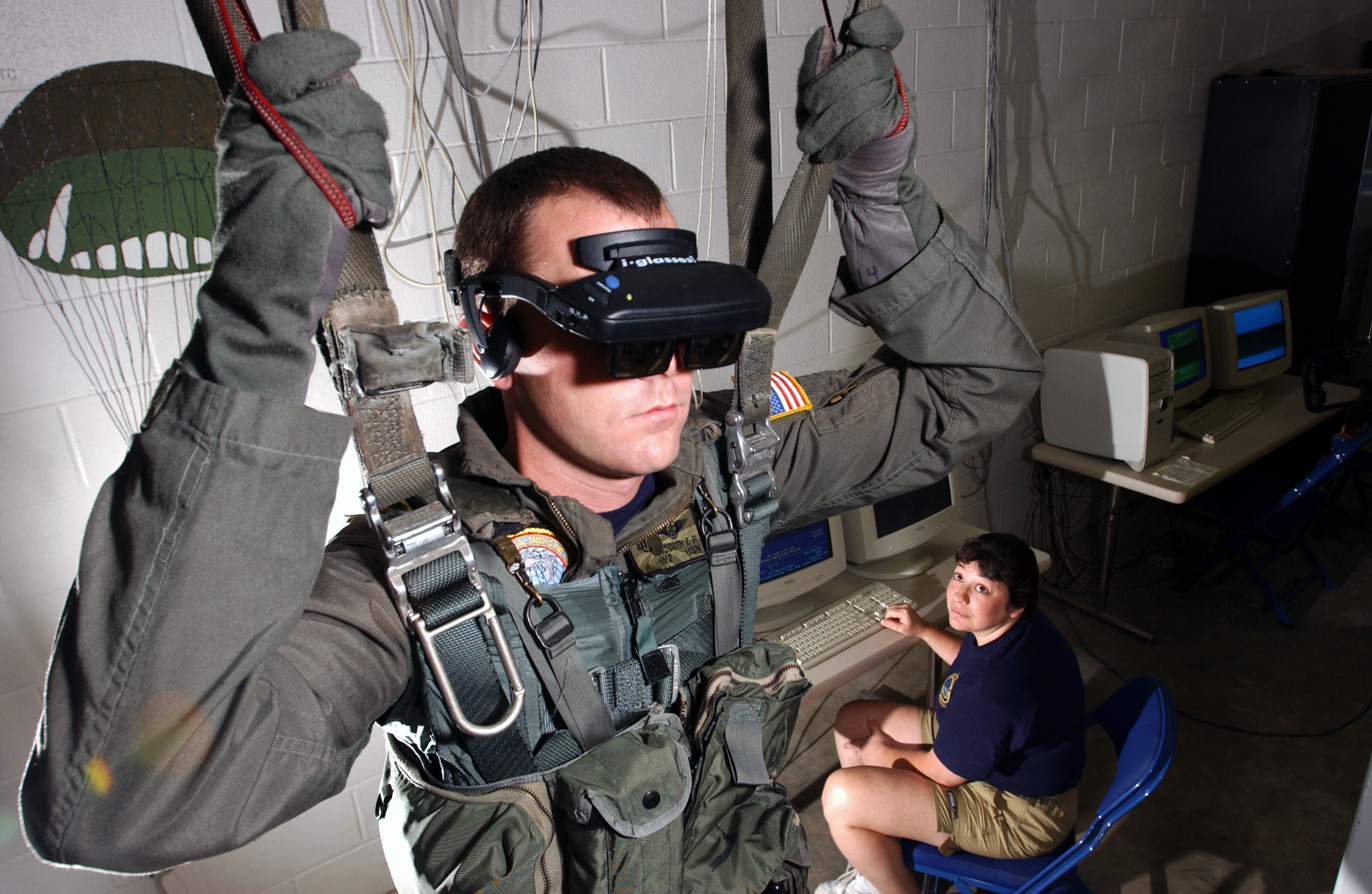
U.S. Navy Hospital Corpsman demonstrating a VR parachute simulator at the Naval Survival Training Institute in 2006

VR can simulate real workspaces for workplace occupational safety and health purposes, educational purposes, and training purposes. It can be used to provide learners with a virtual environment where they can develop their skills without the real-world consequences of failing. It has been used and studied in primary education, anatomy teaching, military, astronaut training, flight simulators, mining and metallurgical operations training, medical education, geography education, architectural design, driver training, and bridge inspection. Immersive VR engineering systems enable engineers to see virtual prototypes prior to the availability of any physical prototypes. Supplementing training with virtual training environments has been claimed to offer avenues of realism in military and healthcare training while minimizing cost. It also has been claimed to reduce military training costs by minimizing the amounts of ammunition expended during training periods. VR can be used for the healthcare training and education for medical practitioners. Further, several application have been developed for multiple types of safety training. The latest results indicates that virtual reality safety training is more effective than traditional training in terms of knowledge acquisition and knowledge retention.

In the engineering field, VR has proved very useful for both engineering educators and the students. A previously expensive cost in the educational department now being much more accessible due to lowered overall costs, has proven to be a very useful tool in educating future engineers. The most significant element lies in the ability for the students to be able to interact with 3-D models that accurately respond based on real world possibilities. This added tool of education provides many the immersion needed to grasp complex topics and be able to apply them. As noted, the future architects and engineers benefit greatly by being able to form understandings between spatial relationships and providing solutions based on real-world future applications.

The first fine art virtual world was created in the 1970s. As the technology developed, more artistic programs were produced throughout the 1990s, including feature films. When commercially available technology became more widespread, VR festivals began to emerge in the mid-2010s. The first uses of VR in museum settings began in the 1990s, seeing a significant increase in the mid-2010s. Additionally, museums have begun making some of their content virtual reality accessible.

Virtual reality's growing market presents an opportunity and an alternative channel for digital marketing. It is also seen as a new platform for e-commerce, particularly in the bid to challenge traditional "brick and mortar" retailers. However, a 2018 study revealed that the majority of goods are still purchased in physical stores.

In the case of education, the uses of virtual reality have demonstrated being capable of promoting higher order thinking, promoting the interest and commitment of students, the acquisition of knowledge, promoting mental habits and understanding that are generally useful within an academic context.

A case has also been made for including virtual reality technology in the context of public libraries. This would give library users access to cutting-edge technology and unique educational experiences. This could include giving users access to virtual, interactive copies of rare texts and artifacts and to tours of famous landmarks and archeological digs (as in the case with the Virtual Ganjali Khan Project).

Starting in the early 2020s, virtual reality has also been discussed as a technological setting that may support people's grieving process, based on digital recreations of deceased individuals. In 2021, this practice received substantial media attention following a South Korean TV documentary, which invited a grieving mother to interact with a virtual replica of her deceased daughter. Subsequently, scientists have summarized several potential implications of such endeavours, including its potential to facilitate adaptive mourning, but also many ethical challenges.

Growing interest in the metaverse has resulted in organizational efforts to incorporate the many diverse applications of virtual reality into ecosystems like VIVERSE, reportedly offering connectivity between platforms for a wide range of uses.

Virtual reality has increasingly been used in various religious applications, including in the creation of metaverse places of worship.

== Medical uses of VR ==
Virtual reality (VR) technology has emerged as a significant tool in medical training and education. Specifically, there has been a major leap in innovation in surgical simulation and surgical real-time enhancement. Studies done at North Carolina medical institutions have demonstrated improvement in technical performance and skills among medical students and active surgeons using VR training as compared to traditional training, especially in procedures such as total hip arthroplasty. Alongside this, other VR simulation programs such as LapSim, improve basic coordination, instrument handling, and procedure-based skills. These simulations aim to have high ratings for feedback and haptic touch, which provides a more realistic surgical feel.

Studies show significant improvement in task completion time and scores after 4-week training sessions of LapSim. This simulation environment also allows surgeons to practice without risk to real patients, promoting patient safety.

Based on data from research conducted from the University Hospitals Schleswig-Holstein and collaborators from other institutions, medical students and surgeons with years of experience, show marked performance boosts after practicing with LapSim VR technology.

Another recent study at North Carolina University of Chapel Hill has shown that developing VR and Augmented Reality (AR) systems have allowed surgeons to keep their eyes on a patient while accessing CT scans. This VR system allows for laparoscopic imaging integration, real-time skin layer visualization, and enhanced surgical precision capabilities.

These are both examples of how studies have shown surgeons can take advantage of additional virtual reality simulation practices, which can create incredible experiences, provide customized scenarios, and provide independent learning with haptic feedback. These VR systems need to be realistic enough for education tools alongside being able to measure performance of a surgeon.

Some potential future challenges of this technology would be enhancing complex scenarios alongside the realism aspects. These technologies would need to incorporate stress-inducing factors along with other realistic simulation ideas. Furthermore, there would be a need to have better AR integration to help the surgeon have better eyes-on precision guidance. Lastly, there would be a strong need to keep things cost-effective with an abundance of availability.

== Concerts ==
In June 2020, Jean Michel Jarre performed in VRChat. In July, Brendan Bradley released the free FutureStages web-based virtual reality venue for live events and concerts throughout the 2020 shutdown, Justin Bieber performed on November 18, 2021 in WaveXR. On December 2, 2021, non-player characters performed at the Mugar Omni Theater with audiences interacting with a live performer in both virtual reality and projected on the IMAX dome screen. Meta's Foo Fighters Super Bowl VR concert performed on Venues. Post Malone performed in Venues starting July 15, 2022. Megan Thee Stallion performed on AMAZE at AMC Theaters throughout 2022.

On October 24, 2021, Billie Eilish performed on Oculus Venues. Pop group Imagine Dragons performed on June 15, 2022.

== Concerns and challenges ==
=== Health and safety ===
There are many health and safety considerations of virtual reality. A number of unwanted symptoms have been caused by prolonged use of virtual reality, and these may have slowed the proliferation of the technology. Most virtual reality systems come with consumer warnings, including seizures; developmental issues in children; trip-and-fall and collision warnings; discomfort; repetitive stress injury; and interference with medical devices. Some users may experience twitches, seizures, or blackouts while using VR headsets, even if they do not have a history of epilepsy and have never had blackouts or seizures before. One in 4,000 people, or .025%, may experience these symptoms. Motion sickness, eyestrain, headaches, and discomfort are the most prevalent short-term adverse effects. In addition, because of the virtual reality headsets' heavy weight, discomfort may be more likely among children. Therefore, children are advised against using VR headsets. Other problems may occur in physical interactions with one's environment. While wearing VR headsets, people quickly lose awareness of their real-world surroundings and may injure themselves by tripping over or colliding with real-world objects.

VR headsets may regularly cause eye fatigue, as does all screened technology, because people tend to blink less when watching screens, causing their eyes to become more dried out. There have been some concerns about VR headsets contributing to myopia, but although VR headsets sit close to the eyes, they may not necessarily contribute to nearsightedness if the focal length of the image being displayed is sufficiently far away.

Virtual reality sickness (also known as cybersickness) occurs when a person's exposure to a virtual environment causes symptoms that are similar to motion sickness symptoms. Women are significantly more affected than men by headset-induced symptoms, at rates of around 77% and 33% respectively. The most common symptoms are general discomfort, headache, stomach awareness, nausea, vomiting, pallor, sweating, fatigue, drowsiness, disorientation, and apathy. For example, Nintendo's Virtual Boy received much criticism for its negative physical effects, including "dizziness, nausea, and headaches". These motion sickness symptoms are caused by a disconnect between what is being seen and what the rest of the body perceives. When the vestibular system, the body's internal balancing system, does not experience the motion that it expects from visual input through the eyes, the user may experience VR sickness. This can also happen if the VR system does not have a high enough frame rate, or if there is a lag between the body's movement and the onscreen visual reaction to it. Because approximately 25–40% of people experience some kind of VR sickness when using VR machines, companies are actively looking for ways to reduce VR sickness.

Vergence-accommodation conflict (VAC) is one of the main causes of virtual reality sickness.

In January 2022 The Wall Street Journal found that VR usage could lead to physical injuries including leg, hand, arm and shoulder injuries. VR usage has also been tied to incidents that resulted in neck injuries (especially injures to the cervical vertebrae).

=== Children and teenagers in virtual reality ===
Children are becoming increasingly aware of VR, with the number in the USA having never heard of it dropping by half from Autumn 2016 (40%) to Spring 2017 (19%).

A 2022 research report by Piper Sandler revealed that only 26% of U.S. teens own a VR device, 5% use it daily, while 48% of teen headset owners "seldom" use it. Of the teens who don't own a VR headset, 9% plan to buy one. 50% of surveyed teens are unsure about the metaverse or don't have any interest, and don't have any plans to purchase a VR headset.

Studies show that young children, compared to adults, may respond cognitively and behaviorally to immersive VR in ways that differ from adults. VR places users directly into the media content, potentially making the experience very vivid and real for children. For example, children of 6–18 years of age reported higher levels of presence and "realness" of a virtual environment compared with adults 19–65 years of age.

Studies on VR consumer behavior or its effect on children and a code of ethical conduct involving underage users are especially needed, given the availability of VR porn and violent content. Related research on violence in video games suggests that exposure to media violence may affect attitudes, behavior, and even self-concept. Self-concept is a key indicator of core attitudes and coping abilities, particularly in adolescents. Early studies conducted on observing versus participating in violent VR games suggest that physiological arousal and aggressive thoughts, but not hostile feelings, are higher for participants than for observers of the virtual reality game.

Experiencing VR by children may further involve simultaneously holding the idea of the virtual world in mind while experiencing the physical world. Excessive usage of immersive technology that has very salient sensory features may compromise children's ability to maintain the rules of the physical world, particularly when wearing a VR headset that blocks out the location of objects in the physical world. Immersive VR can provide users with multisensory experiences that replicate reality or create scenarios that are impossible or dangerous in the physical world. Observations of 10 children experiencing VR for the first time suggested that 8-12-years-old kids were more confident to explore VR content when it was in a familiar situation, e.g. the children enjoyed playing in the kitchen context of Job Simulator, and enjoyed breaking rules by engaging in activities they are not allowed to do in reality, such as setting things on fire.

=== Privacy ===
Digital privacy concerns have been associated with VR platforms; the persistent tracking required by all VR systems makes the technology particularly useful for, and vulnerable to, mass surveillance, including information gathering of personal actions, movements and responses. Data from eye tracking sensors, which are projected to become a standard feature in virtual reality headsets, may indirectly reveal information about a user's ethnicity, personality traits, fears, emotions, interests, skills, and physical and mental health conditions.

The nature of VR technology means that it can gather a wide range of data about its users. This can include obvious information such as usernames and account information, but also extends to more personal data like physical movements, interaction habits, and responses to virtual environments. In addition, advanced VR systems can capture biometric data like voice patterns, eye movements, and physiological responses to VR experiences. Virtual reality technology has grown substantially since its inception, moving from a niche technology to a mainstream consumer product. As the user base has grown, so too has the amount of personal data collected by these systems. This data can be used to improve VR systems, to provide personalized experiences, or to collect demographic information for marketing purposes. However, it also raises significant privacy concerns, especially when this data is stored, shared, or sold without the user's explicit consent.

Existing data protection and privacy laws like the General Data Protection Regulation (GDPR) in the EU, and the California Consumer Privacy Act (CCPA) in the United States, can be applied to VR. These regulations require companies to disclose how they collect and use data, and give users a degree of control over their personal information. Despite these regulations, enforcing privacy laws in VR can be challenging due to the global nature of the technology and the vast amounts of data collected.

Due to its history of privacy issues, the involvement of Meta Platforms (formerly Facebook, Inc.) in the VR market has led to privacy concerns specific to its platforms. In August 2020, Facebook announced that Oculus products would become subject to the terms of use and privacy policy of the Facebook social network, and that a Facebook account would be required to use future Oculus headset models, and all existing models (via deprecation of the separate Oculus account system) beginning January 2023. The announcement was criticized for the mandatory integration of Oculus headsets with Facebook data collection and policies (including the Facebook real-name policy), and preventing use of the hardware if the user's account is suspended. The following month, Facebook halted the sale of Oculus products in Germany due to concerns from regulators that the new policy was a violation of GDPR. In 2022, the company would later establish a separate "Meta account" system.

In 2024, researchers from the University of Chicago demonstrated a security vulnerability in Meta Quest's Android-based system software (leveraging "Developer Mode" to inject an infected app), allowing them to obtain users' login credentials and inject false details during online banking sessions. This attack was considered to be difficult to execute outside of research settings but would make its target vulnerable to risks such as phishing, Internet fraud, and grooming.

== See also ==
- 16K resolution – Video or display resolutions with a width of around 16,000 pixels
- 360-degree video – Visual arts technique
- The AlloSphere Research Facility (AlloSphere) – Research laboratory at the University of California, Santa Barbara
- Computer-mediated reality – Ability to manipulate one's perception of reality through the use of a computer
- Diorama – Three-dimensional full-size or miniature model
- Extended reality – Combined real-and-virtual environment
- Gustatory technology – Engineering discipline dealing with gustatory representation
- Haptic suit – Wearable device that provides haptic feedback
- Holographic principle – Principle in theoretical physics
- Hyperreality – Term for cultural process of shifting ideas of reality
- List of virtual reality headsets
- Metaverse – Collective 3D virtual shared space
- Augmented reality – Form of 3D computer interaction merging the real world with virtual objects
- MOO – Text-based online virtual reality system
- Simulation – Imitation of the operation of a real-world process or system over time
- Virtual body – State of being in a computer-simulated environment
- Virtual globe – 3D software model or representation of Earth or another world
- Virtual machining – Computers simulating and modeling use of machine tools for part manufacturing
- Virtual reality in fiction
- Virtual reality in nursing – Use of virtual reality technology in Nursing
- Virtual reality website
