= Virtual reality website =

A virtual reality website is a website that leverages the WebVR and WebGL APIs to create a 3D environment for a web user to explore using a virtual reality head-mounted display.

== History ==
In June 2014, Mozilla released builds of Firefox with compatibility with Oculus Rift through WebVR, and in November of that year launched MozVR.com, a Virtual Reality Website showcasing web-based virtual reality demos, tied together with a virtual reality navigation interface.

Experimental builds of Google Chrome also use WebVR to support Oculus Rift, Google Cardboard, Project Tango and HTC Vive.

In 2014, Google launched 'Chrome Experiments for Virtual Reality'; a Virtual Reality mobile site showcasing web-based Virtual Reality demos for Google Cardboard.

In 2015, Mozilla released A-Frame (VR), an open source web framework for building VR experiences and websites.
