= Virtual reality in nursing =

Use of virtual reality technology in Nursing

Virtual reality is the creation of a three-dimensional, interactive environment. With this technology, users are able to move through this developed simulation, as if it is real.

== Virtual reality and nursing education ==
=== Virtual reality and nursing education ===
Through the use of virtual reality, nursing students are given the opportunity to learn in a patient care scenario without the pressure of mistakes, unsafe consequences or placing the patient in danger.

With patient safety being the cornerstone of nursing, it is important that nursing students are taught with this principle in mind. Through virtual reality, this learning environment can be created.

Traditional simulation labs, as seen and discussed in this video are the teaching mode many universities and colleges currently use. However, due to a number of growing concerns and challenges this form of lab simulation is not always preferred or possible.

=== Shift towards virtual reality in nursing education ===
With many nursing skills taught in a simulation lab, it is important there is enough access to this resource. However, there is a limitation on available resources, including physical space, time and equipment. Virtual reality can be the answer to ensure nursing students are still gaining the required knowledge and skills to safely practice.

With a lack of available resources, organizations are looking for alternatives to support the growing number of nursing students needing exposure to basic nursing skills and knowledge.

It can be very difficult to find numerous and appropriate clinical placements for students to attend allowing them to gain the required knowledge and skills to safely practice as a nurse. Even when clinical placements are obtained, some of the restrictions in place, limit the students ability to practice skills and knowledge. Through the use of virtual reality, educators can create a simulated clinical environment to support the students learning when required resources are not available.

The following video is an excellent example of how virtual reality is able to create a clinical environment for students to learn in. An example of a clinical placement and piece of nursing education is home care services, with a lack of available resources to do so, virtual reality can still maintain the students learning.

=== COVID-19 and impact on nursing education ===
With a global pandemic leading to quarantining and locking down countries across the world, a number of changes needed to be put in place to allow educational studies to continue while keeping students safe.

Educational programs turned to the use of virtual learning, online courses and remote classrooms to keep everyone safe while allowing students the opportunity to continue their education. The concern with this learning style is that it does not easily transfer to clinical placements, lab simulations and hands-on learning found throughout the nursing program.

Sentinel U reviews how the use of virtual reality can overcome the challenges faced with COVID-19.

Throughout the pandemic learning institutions were pushed to institute educational tools that allowed students to learn and function as if they were in a lab or clinical placement without leaving the safety of their space.

Health Tech Magazine reports how nursing education can be managed during a pandemic through the use of virtual reality technology.

Virtual reality became a replacement for clinical placements in hospitals and simulation labs, both vital parts in a nurse's educational process.

== Ways virtual reality can be used for nursing education ==
Nursing education encompasses the theory and practical skills required to safely practice as a nurse. Education comes from classroom learning through traditional textbooks. Labs for skill based learning and clinical placements where students get practical patient exposure and experience.

The following are a list of examples where virtual reality can be incorporated to elevate nursing education:

=== Skills and simulation learning ===
Currently skills-based learning required for the nursing program takes place in a lab or simulation environment. The concern with simulation learning or the use of sims is the lack of realism.

Through the use of virtual reality, the simulation learning environment can be more realistic. If using virtual reality to develop the simulation lab, nursing students will have the opportunity to have a more accurate depiction of the clinical setting, enhancing learning.

The following Video is an example of how virtual reality can be used in a clinical lab for nursing education. The video looks to include virtual reality into the skills lab to enhance the learning that is currently taking place.

=== Mental health training ===
Much of the mental health training that is done for professionals, is completed through the use of role play. This style of learning has many benefits but has a number of limitations that may be addressed with the utilization of a virtual client trainer through the use of a virtual reality.

Through the development of a virtual patient, users are able to enter the virtual reality technology and learn how to develop client-patient relationships. Through this technology, scenarios can be created and learners can work on mental health interactions in a safe and controlled environment.

A study was completed between 2017 and 2018 that looked to understand the comparison in learning that takes place through the use of traditional role play verse virtual reality when completing mental health training.

Virtual reality is a comparable tool that allows learners to identify mental health symptoms, develop effective relationships and respond to mental health needs.

The following is a presentation titled "The Use of Immersive Virtual Reality to Enhance Mental Health Assessment Skills" which was presented at a Simulation Symposium. The presentation explores how virtual reality can be used to develop and enhance nursing students mental health skills.

=== Emergency training- cardiopulmonary resuscitation ===
With a growing need for professionals and non-professionals to be CPR trained, researchers are looking to harness the technological properties in virtual reality and combine it with standard mannequins to develop an accessible teaching program. The goal for this collaboration is to continue to teach high-quality CPR to the largest number of people despite the decrease in physical training due to limitation on group meetings.

With much of CPR training done in large groups, in small classrooms there is a dwindling number of offerings, this was highlighted during the COVID-19 pandemic when limitations on group events took place. The hope is to utilize virtual reality technology to still bring high quality CPR training to learners regardless of the physical environment.

4 HELP VR is a training program designed to teach first aid through virtual reality. The company has developed software through the use of virtual reality to teach emergency training in an interactive and engaging manner.

=== Anatomy, physiology and classroom enhancement ===
Currently most anatomy and physiology courses found within the nursing program are taught through traditional classroom tools. Although this is effective there is room for improvement to enhance learning, while considered pedagogically concepts.

Through the use of virtual reality, theory-based courses can become more engaging. Virtual reality can be used to create an interactive learning experience.

Virtual reality can allow students to take the theory from a textbook and touch, feel and manipulate the human body to better understand its function.

The overall goal for virtual reality in nursing education is to create a new environment that addresses the current concerns associated with lack of resources and realism. Through virtual reality, nursing students are able to still gain the required skills and knowledge to safely practice despite the lack of resources, equipment and lock-downs, while also enhancing traditional learning techniques.
