= Loft Dynamics =

Swiss aviation simulation company

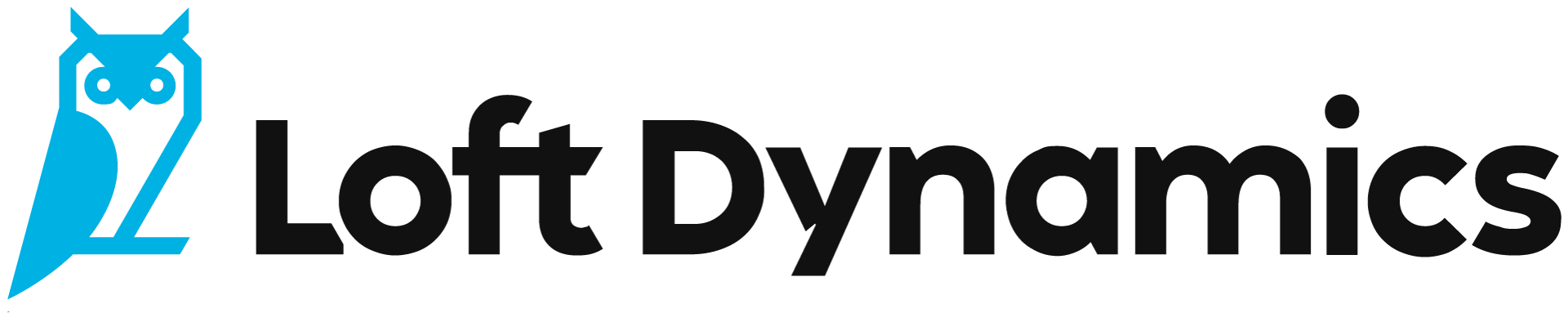
- Industry: Aerospace; Virtual Reality Simulation
- Founded: 2016; 10 years ago in Switzerland
- Founder: Fabi Riesen
- Headquarters: Switzerland
- Products: Flight simulators
- Number of employees: 90+
- Website: www.loftdynamics.com

Loft Dynamics is a Swiss aviation simulation and training company based in Dübendorf, a suburb of Zurich. It was established in 2016 by Fabi Riesen, who serves as the CTO. Loft Dynamics produces the first virtual reality aircraft simulators in the world to receive formal regulatory approval from the Federal Aviation Administration (FAA) in the United States and the European Union Aviation Safety Agency (EASA). The company has been cited as a "global pioneer in digital aviation simulation."

Loft Dynamics' VR training solutions span rotorcraft, eVTOLs, and fixed-wing and serve a range of operators, OEMs, schools and more—including Alaska Airlines, the Federal Aviation Administration, Airbus Helicopters, Los Angeles Police Department, Marshall University, Air Greenland, and Air Zermatt.

Loft Dynamics states that its mission is to "revolutionize global aviation by providing best-in-class pilot training that is safe, accessible, and affordable."

Loft Dynamics simulators use a combination of VR technology and pose tracking, a full-scale replica cockpit, and a motion platform to simulate real-world flight. This enables pilots to practice complex or dangerous flight maneuvers and realistically train for a range of operations and scenarios in many different environments.

== History ==
Loft Dynamics was founded in 2016 by Fabi Riesen, a Swiss electrical engineer and pilot who continues to serve as company's CEO.

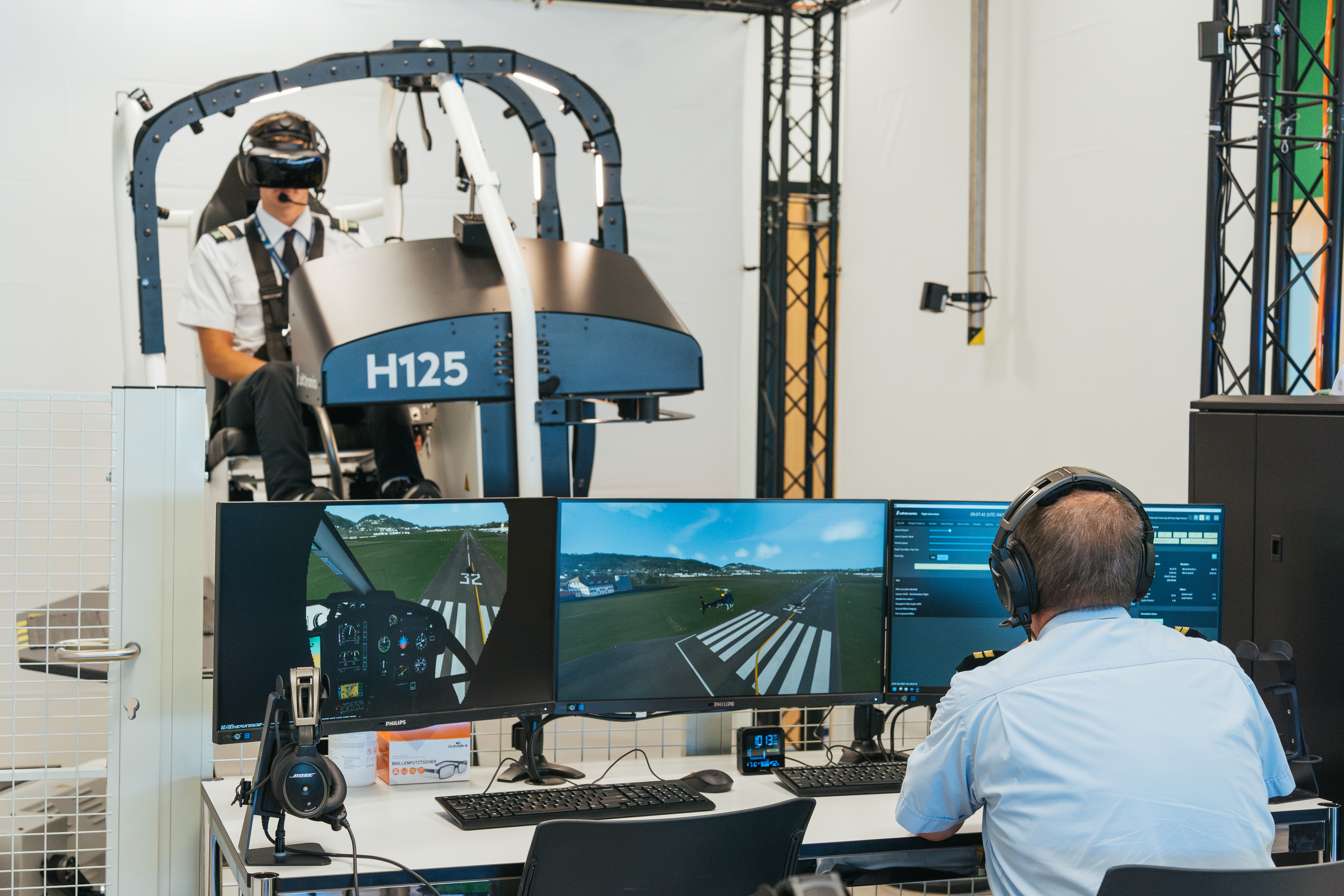
Loft Dynamics' virtual reality H125 training device based at Marshall University - the first virtual reality training device qualified by the FAA

=== 2021 ===
In April 2021, European Union Aviation Safety Agency (EASA) approved Loft Dynamics' Robinson R22 flight simulator for FTD Level 3 qualified flight training.

The company entered into a commercial partnership with Airbus Helicopters at the 2022 HAI Heli-Expo in Dallas, Texas.

=== 2022 ===
In May 2022, EASA qualified the company's Airbus H125 simulator, which was officially launched at Helitrans in Norway.

In July 2022, the company extended its partnership with Airbus Helicopters to develop a training device for the twin-engine Airbus H145.

In December 2022, Loft Dynamics announced that it had secured $20 million in venture financing from investors such as David Sacks's Craft Ventures, Sky Dayton and UP Partners to expand internationally.

=== 2023 ===
In July 2023, Loft Dynamics announced a partnership with the FAA to test its VR simulators for helicopter training in the US. Two Loft Dynamics simulators were installed at the FAA's William J. Hughes Technical Center in New Jersey, where they are being used to work toward the safety and efficiency goals of the Next Generation Air Transportation System (NextGen). In late 2023, the simulator was installed at Blackcomb Helicopters in Whistler, British Columbia, Canada.

=== 2024 ===
In February 2024, Loft Dynamics opened its new North American headquarters and VR flight simulator training center at Santa Monica Airport. The training center features a Loft Dynamics Airbus H125 VR simulator. That same month, the company announced a partnership with the Los Angeles Police Department Air Support Division, which purchased an Airbus H125 simulator to train its pilots. Loft Dynamics has several other North American partners, including Blackcomb Helicopters in Vancouver, Colorado Highland Helicopters, and Marshall University in West Virginia.

In May 2024, Loft Dynamics formed a partnership with Dufour Aerospace, founded by Air Zermatt rescue pilot Thomas Pfammatter, to build the Aero3 VR electric vertical take-off and landing (eVTOL) simulator, the first ever for eVTOL training.

In June 2024, the company received regulatory approval from EASA for a VR helicopter external sling load (HESLO) training feature, the first of its kind.

In July 2024, the FAA qualified Loft Dynamics' H125 simulator, making it the first VR device to receive such qualification in the United States.

=== 2025 ===
In April 2025, Loft Dynamics announced it had entered fixed-wing VR simulation, launching with a partnership alongside Alaska Airlines. The companies announced they would co-develop the world's first Boeing 737 VR simulators to solve the cost and accessibility challenges of legacy full-flight simulators. Alaska Airlines stated that the goal is to deploy multiple VR simulators across its US bases as a way to improve the realism and accessibility of pilot training.

In August 2025, Loft Dynamics secured $24 million in a Series B funding round led by Dan Friedkin and The Friedkin Group with participation from Alaska Airlines, Sky Dayton, Craft Ventures, and UP.Partners. It brought Loft's total capital to $60 million.

In November 2025, Loft Dynamics announced that United States Customs and Border Protection will begin installation of its VR simulator for training. According to media reports, it will be the first U.S. federal law enforcement agency and first branch of the Homeland Security Department to train pilots using virtual reality flight simulators. PHI Air Medical also announced the installation of its Loft Dynamics VR simulator at its base, sharing it will become the first air medical operator in the Americas to implement full-motion virtual reality flight simulation for pilot training.

== Leadership ==
Loft Dynamics has two cofounders: Fabi Riesen and Christian Marty. As of 2026, Riesen is the CTO of Loft Dynamics, having previously held the role of CEO from 2016 to 2025. In January 2026, the company announced Sebastien Borel as CEO. In 2024, Loft Dynamics added former FAA administrators Randy Babbitt and Michael Huerta to its Advisory Board.

== Technology ==
Loft Dynamics uses state-of-the-art virtual reality technology, employing cloud-based software to enable pilots of all skill levels to practice complex or dangerous flight maneuvers and undergo realistic training for missions, and potentially landmarks all across the world. The ISO 9001-certified simulators, which are ten times smaller than traditional flight simulators, are equipped with "three-dimensional high-resolution panoramic view, dynamic six-degrees-of-freedom motion platform and a full-scale replica cockpit with a unique pose tracking system". The Virtual Reality headsets, made by Finnish company Varjo, feature a "90Hz frame refresh rate, a 2 x 8 megapixel resolution and a 30 pixel-per-degree display". One of the major advantages of the VR simulators is a 360-degree field of view.

As of April 2025, Loft Dynamics has three active helicopter simulators: the Airbus H125, Robinson R22, and Airbus H145 simulator. The company is developing its eVTOL simulator alongside Dufour Aerospace and its 737 VR simulator in cooperation with Boeing and Alaska Airlines.
