= Virtual body =

State of being in a computer-simulated environment

A virtual body is the state of being when inhabiting virtual reality or a virtual environment.

A person connected to the internet is considered not only physically in the space in front of the computer but also virtually represented, with the opportunity to interact, in cyberspace. This indicates the potential for the body to simultaneously exist in two realities, internally and externally experiencing and being experienced. The virtual body is also recognized as an escape from the limits set by reality and different forms of conventionality.

== Frequently discussed modes ==
There are two particular ways that the virtual body is frequently discussed; the disembodied essence of a person's mind in cyberspace and the consequent representation of a person's identity as a virtual body in cyberspace.

The 'disembodiment' discourse focuses on allowing the mind to wander without the physical inhibitions of the body. This discourse is regarded as an expansion of classic theories such as astral projection or 'out-of-body experiences'. Subsequently, the virtual body is regarded as psychologically created essence that is virtually floating between information. This information in turn, according to theories, affects the mind and the virtual body but has no interaction with the physical body, which has deployed a technological gaze.

An early issue frequently discussed virtual bodies and that although the opportunity was presented to create and be any sort of virtual body imaginable, there was a tendency to reproduce old identities referring to gender and racial stereotypes. Therefore, the disembodiment of before transforms into 'a new body' with a new identity that is either entirely new or a representation of the real. When new identities are explored, it has been noticed that the virtual body effortlessly (and sometimes subconsciously) crosses traditional borders, not only concerning identities but also of human and machine, particularly in the sense of having a clear notion of what is real and what is only available through collaboration with the computer. This 'border crossing' implies that the virtual body in itself is a fluid state of being that conceals itself within social conventions.

== Other notions ==
The virtual body can also be regarded as needing the body for extra immersion into a virtual environment. This notion was initially discussed in reference to the original developments of Virtual Reality, where goggles and gloves were required to fully immerse the mind into virtual worlds. This type of virtual reality offers a different kind of virtual body because it generates the idea within the mind that the virtual body and the real physical body are one and the same.

A more common notion of the identities constructed by people (and therefore depicted through virtual bodies or avatars) is the representation people give on websites such as Facebook and MySpace. These websites offer a more direct way for people to exhibit how they want to be seen and understood, which in turn develops their virtual body representation. Along the same lines, is the identity significant idea behind chat rooms (particularly dating ones) where there would be issues regarding how different the represented virtual body and identity is to the real physical one. This is unlike virtual bodies created for the sake of playing games online where exaggeration and the use of the imagination is encouraged.
