= Virtual machining =

Computers simulating and modeling use of machine tools for part manufacturing

Virtual machining is the practice of using computers to simulate and model the use of machine tools for part manufacturing. Such activity replicates the behavior and errors of a real environment in virtual reality systems. This can provide useful ways to manufacture products without physical testing on the shop floor. As a result, time and cost of part production can be decreased.

== Applications ==
Virtual machining provides various benefits:

- Simulated machining process in virtual environments reveals errors without wasting materials, damaging machine tools, or putting workers at risk.
- A computer simulation helps improve accuracy in the produced part.
- Virtual inspection systems such as surface finish, surface metrology, and waviness can be applied to the simulated parts in virtual environments to increase accuracy.
- Systems can augment process planning of machining operations with regards to the desired tolerances of part designing.
- Virtual machining system can be used in process planning of machining operations by considering the most suitable steps of machining operations with regard to the time and cost of part manufacturing.
- Optimization techniques can be applied to the simulated machining process to increase efficiency of parts production.
- Finite element method (FEM) can be applied to the simulated machining process in virtual environments to analyze stress and strain of the machine tool, workpiece and cutting tool.
- Accuracy of mathematical error modeling in prediction of machined surfaces can be analyzed by using the virtual machining systems.
- Machining operations of flexible materials can be analyzed in virtual environments to increase accuracy of part manufacturing.
- Vibrations of machine tools as well as possibility of chatter along cutting tool paths in machining operations can be analyzed by using simulated machining operations in virtual environments.
- Time and cost of accurate production can be decreased by applying rules of production process management to the simulated manufacturing process in the virtual environment.
- Feed rate scheduling systems based on virtual machining can also be presented to increase accuracy as well as efficiency of part manufacturing.
- Material removal rate in machining operations of complex surfaces can be simulated in virtual environments for analysis and optimization.
- Efficiency of part manufacturing can be improved by analyzing and optimizing production methods.
- Errors in actual machined parts can be simulated in virtual environments for analysis and compensation.
- Simulated machining centers in virtual environments can be connected by the network and Internet for remote analysis and modification.
- Elements and structures of machine tools such as spindle, rotation axis, moving axes, ball screw, numerical control unit, electric motors (step motor and servomotor), bed and et al. can be simulated in virtual environments so they can be analyzed and modified. As a result, optimized versions of machine tool elements can boost levels of technology in part manufacturing.
- Geometry of cutting tools can be analyzed and modified as a result of simulated cutting forces in virtual environments. Thus, machining time as well as surface roughness can be minimized and tool life can be maximized due to decreasing cutting forces by modified geometries of cutting tools. Also, the modified versions of cutting tool geometries with regards to minimizing cutting forces can decrease cost of cutting tools by presenting a wider range of acceptable materials for cutting tools such as high-speed steel, carbon tool steels, cemented carbide, ceramic, cermet and et al.
- The generated heat in engagement areas of cutting tool and workpiece can be simulated, analyzed, and decreased. Tool life can be maximized as a result of decreasing generated heat in engagement areas of cutting tool and workpiece.
- Machining strategies can be analyzed and modified in virtual environments in terms of collision detection processes.
- 3D vision of machining operations with errors of actual machined parts and tool deflection error in virtual environments can help designers as well as machining strategists to analyze and modify the process of part production.
- Virtual machining can augment the experience and training of novice machine tool operators in a virtual machining training system.
- To increase added value in processes of part production, energy consumption of machine tools can be simulated and analyzed in virtual environments by presenting an efficient energy use machine tool.
- Machining strategies of freeform surfaces can be analyzed and optimized in virtual environments to increase accuracy of part manufacturing.

== Future research works ==
Some suggestions for the future studies in virtual machining systems are presented as:

- Machining operations of new alloy can be simulated in virtual environments for study. As a result, deformation, surface properties and residue stress of new alloy can be analyzed and modified.
- New material of cutting tool can be simulated and analyzed in virtual environments. Thus, tool deflection error of new cutting tools along machining paths can be studied without the need of actual machining operations.
- Deformation and deflections of large workpieces can be simulated and analyzed in virtual environments.
- Machining operations of expensive materials such as gold as well as superalloys can be simulated in virtual environments to predict real machining conditions without the need of shop floor testing.
