= Virtual reality applications =

Overview of the various applications that make use of virtual reality

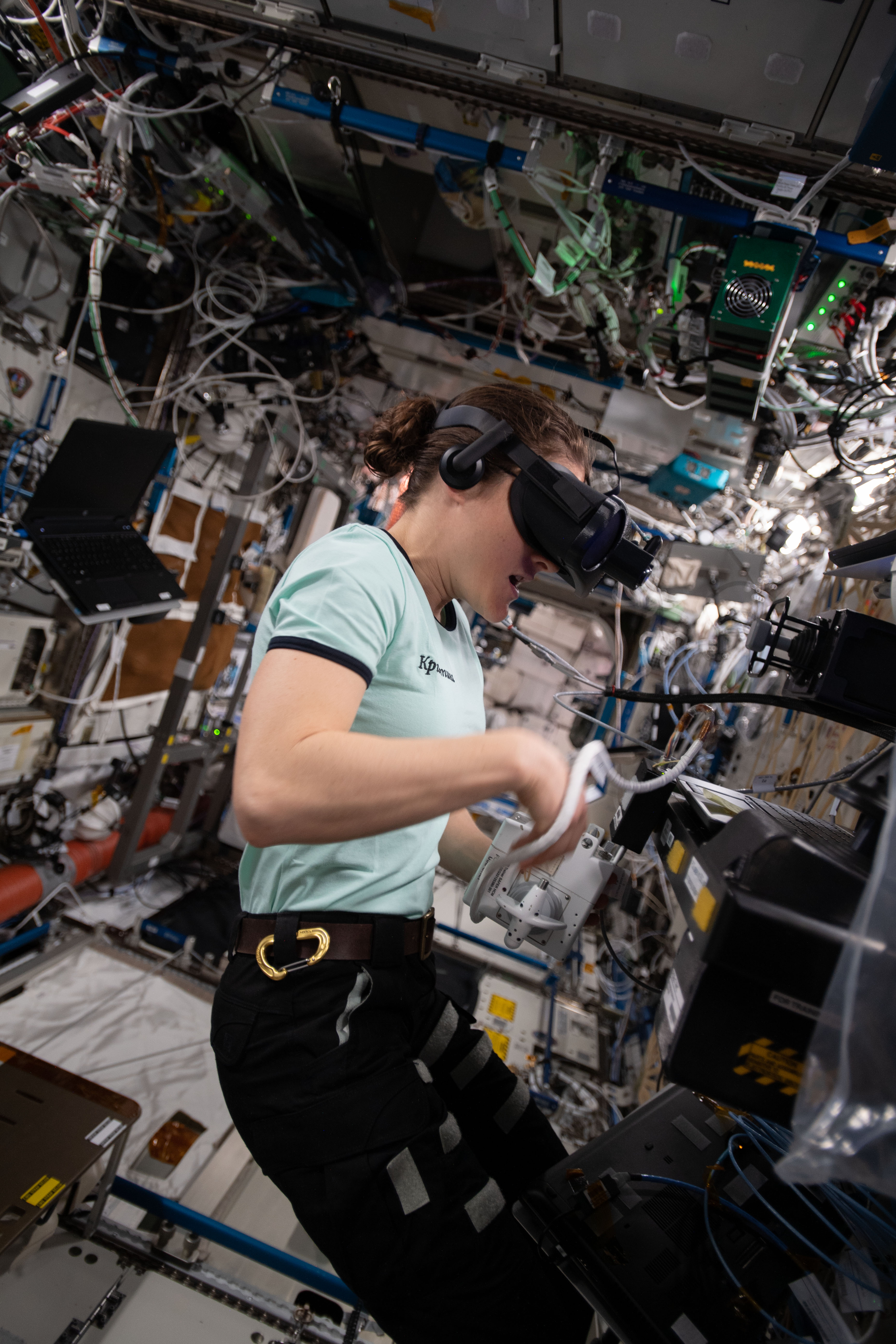
NASA astronaut and Expedition 59 Flight Engineer Christina Koch wears a VR headset for the Vection study that is exploring how microgravity affects an astronaut's motion, orientation and distance perception in 2019

There are many applications of virtual reality (VR). Applications have been developed in a variety of domains, such as architectural and urban design, industrial designs, restorative nature experiences, healthcare and clinical therapies, digital marketing and activism, education and training, engineering and robotics, entertainment, virtual communities, fine arts, heritage and archaeology, occupational safety, as well as social science and psychology.

Virtual Reality (VR) is revolutionizing industries by enabling immersive, interactive simulations that greatly improve the work of professionals in these industries. VR is changing how experts approach problems and come up with creative solutions in a variety of fields, including architecture and urban planning, where it helps visualize intricate structures and simulate entire cities, and healthcare and surgery, where it enhances accuracy and patient safety. As evidenced by successful collaborative operations using VR platforms, advancements in VR enable surgeons to train in risk-free environments and sketch out treatments customized for particular patients.

VR applications promote technical proficiency, offer practical experience, and improve patient outcomes by decreasing errors and boosting productivity in medical education. Beyond healthcare, virtual reality (VR) plays a key role in improving education and training through realistic, interactive settings, designing safer workplaces, and producing calming nature experiences. These developments demonstrate VR's ability to revolutionize a variety of industries, but issues like affordability, usability, and realism still need to be addressed.

VR also extends its impact into the marketing world, where immersive 3D experiences engage customers in unique ways that get them excited about products. Additionally, VR's role in mental health through therapies for PTSD and anxiety disorders demonstrates its psychological value.

== Architecture and urban design ==
One of the first recorded uses of virtual reality in architecture was in the late 1990s when the University of North Carolina virtually modeled Sitterman Hall, home of its computer science department. Designers wore a headset and used a hand controller to simulate moving around a virtual space. With an Autodesk Revit model, they could "walk through" a schematic. VR enables architects to better understand the details of a project, such as the transition of materials, sightlines, or visual displays of wall stress, wind loads, solar heat gain, or other engineering factors.

The application of VR expanded from single buildings to city-scale environments during the late 1990s through digital city initiatives. For example, the "Helsinki Arena 2000" project, initiated in 1996, featured a 3D model of the city that served as a technical interface where citizens could communicate via two-way live video within the virtual space. Similarly, Digital City Kyoto (launched in 1998) served as an advanced testbed connecting physical urban environments with virtual spaces, utilizing its 3D virtual city for practical applications such as disaster evacuation simulations using autonomous agents.

By 2010, VR programs had been developed for urban regeneration, planning and transportation projects. Entire cities were simulated in VR.

== Industrial design ==
Virtual reality and artificial intelligence are used by automotive firms like Porsche and BMW to optimize their production chains. Software developers are building VR solutions to skip redundant design workflow phases and meet end-user expectations faster and more accurately.

== Restorative nature experiences ==
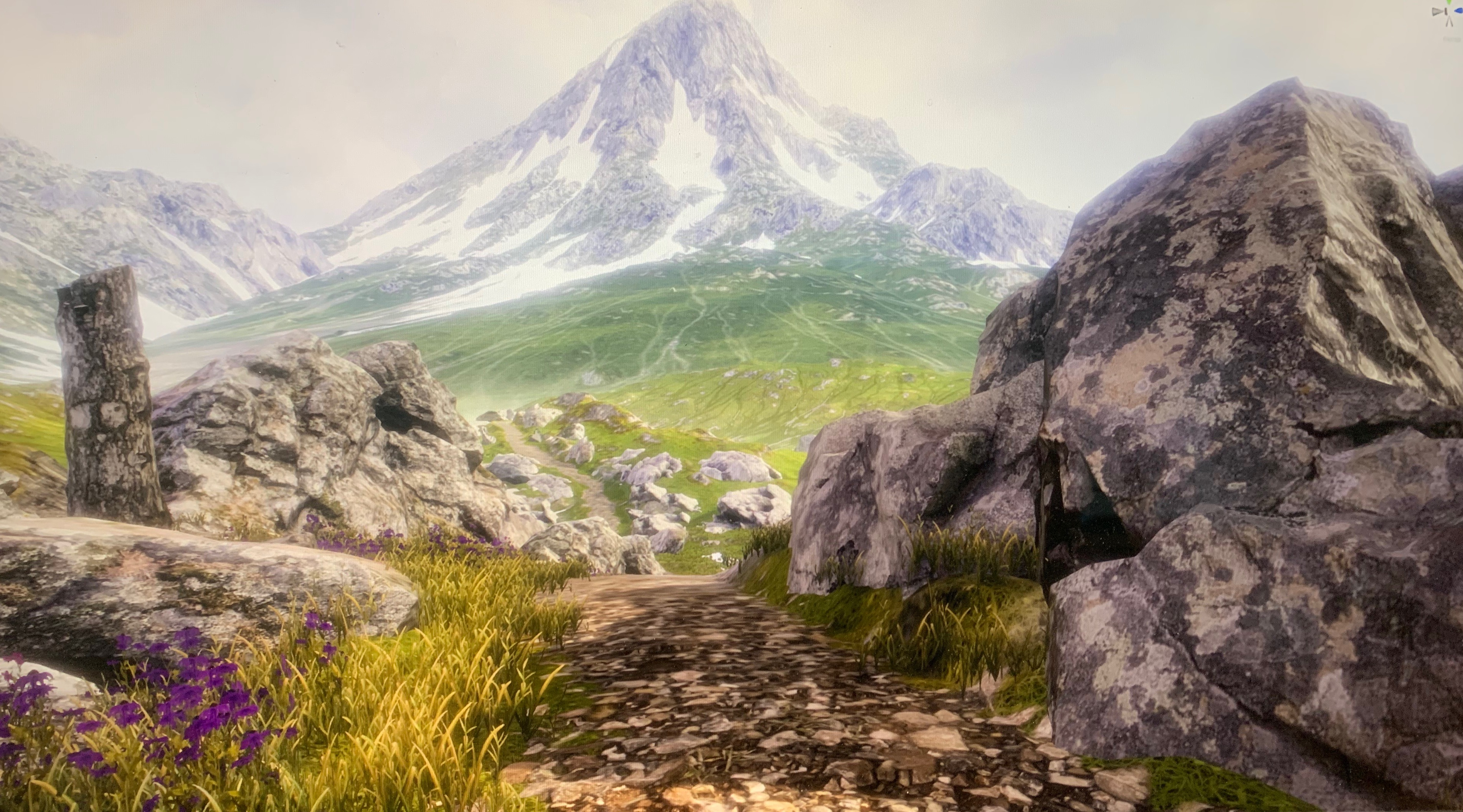
An example of a nature-oriented virtual environment made with real-time rendering engine Unity.

Studies on exposure to nature environments show how they are able to help individuals relax, recover attention capacity and cognitive function, reduce stress and stimulate positive moods. The Attention Restoration Theory and Stress Recovery Theory explain the mechanisms by which VR nature environments can lead to mental restoration. This is in contrast to urban environments that have shown to be less restorative.

Immersive virtual reality technology is able to replicate believable restorative nature experiences, either using 360 degree video footage or environments created from 3D real-time rendering, often developed using game engines like Unreal Engine or Unity. This is useful for users who cannot access certain areas, for example, senior citizens or residents of nursing homes who face physical restraints or complications. In 2016, the Southwest Florida Eagle Cam introduced a spherical webcam offering a live immersive virtual reality experience.

== Healthcare and medicine ==
VR is being applied to a wide range of medical areas, including medical education, training, surgery and diagnostic assistance for healthcare staff. For healthcare professionals, by exploring computer generated, three-dimensional (3D), multimedia sensory environments in real time, whether realistic or artificial, they can gain practical knowledge that can be used in clinical practice. For patients, VR can be utilised for surgery, rehabilitation and training to alleviate medical symptoms and cure diseases. VR began to appear in rehabilitation in the 2000s.

=== Training for healthcare professionals ===
With the rise of COVID-19 in 2020, opportunities for clinical training and education were greatly reduced due to the lack of availability of clinical educators and the need to establish social distancing by avoiding in-person interaction. However, in recent years, there has been a resurge in funding, thus, many institutions have developed simulations to teach their medical students. Particularly in the field of diabetes, a study named DEVICE (Diabetes Emergencies: Virtual Interactive Clinical Education) allowed non-specialist clinics to undergo training so that they can better identify and treat diabetes patients.

==== Use of VR Training in Surgery ====
VR is being increasingly used to train surgeons by providing realistic surgery simulators that replicate real-life scenarios. These tools allow for hands-on practice in a safe environment, improving precision and skills without the risks associated with real patients. This allows new surgeons to practice and receive feedback without needing an expert surgeon to walk them through the process. The technology is also used in veterinary surgery.

Research shows that physicians who experience VR simulations improved their dexterity and performance in the operating room significantly more than control groups. A 2020 study found that clinical students trained through VR scored higher across various areas, including diagnosis, surgical methods, and overall performance, compared to those taught traditionally. Trainees may use real instruments and video equipment to practice in simulated surgeries. Through the revolution of computational analysis abilities, fully immersive VR models are currently available in neurosurgery training. Ventriculostomy catheters insertion, endoscopic and endovascular simulations are used in neurosurgical residency training centers across the world. Experts see VR training as an essential part of the curriculum of future training of neurosurgeons.

In one of these studies for example, from 2022, Participants were given a touch-screen monitor, two surgical handlers, and two-foot pedals that were designed to emulate a real world laparoscopic simulator. When participants were asked to perform simulated surgery tasks (Figure 1), they performed significantly better than a control group that wasn't training using VR. In addition to doing better on tasks, those who got VR training demonstrated significant time savings and enhanced performance in the previously mentioned critical areas. Participants who trained using virtual reality also demonstrated reduced cognitive load, suggesting that they were able to learn the content with significantly less mental strain. These findings demonstrate how VR-based simulators, which provide a secure and entertaining environment for practicing surgical techniques, have the potential to completely transform laparoscopic training.

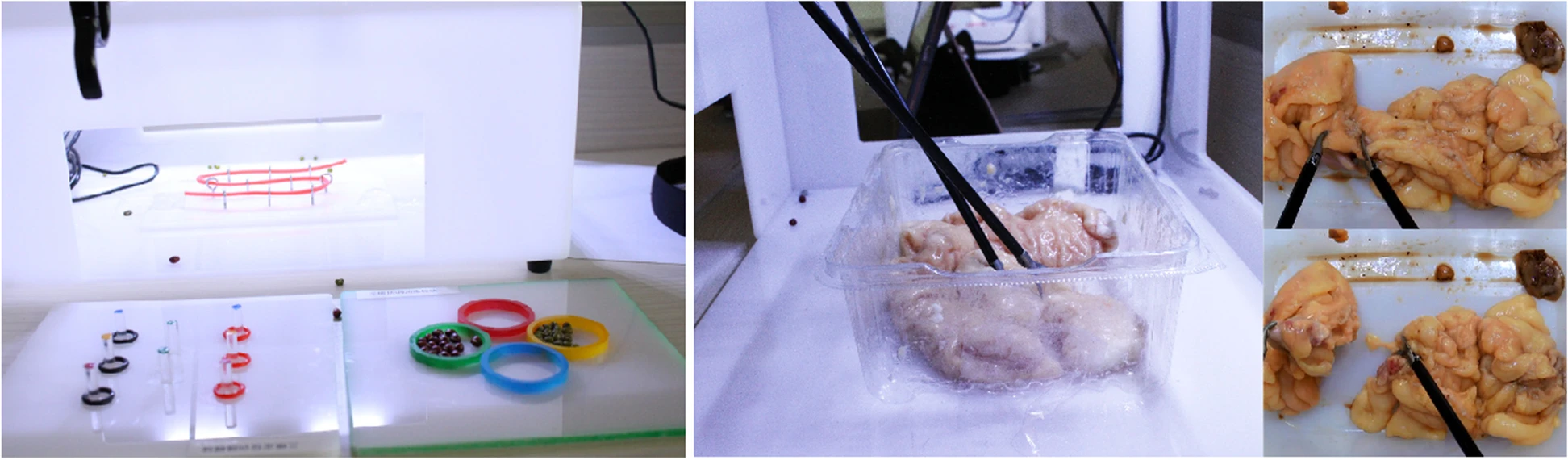
The three tests tested in the 2022 study (from left to right) peg transfer, picking beans, and threading skill practice.

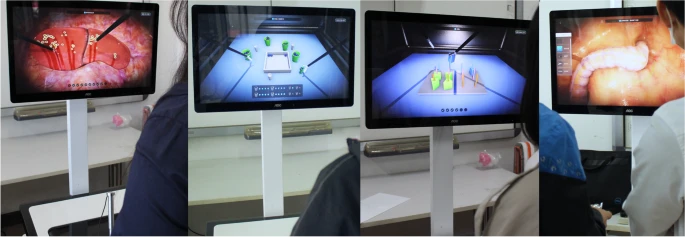
The virtual reality simulator from the 2022 study, depicting (from left to right) fixed point hemostasis, peg transfer, picking beams and colon resection

VR technology has emerged as a potential tool for medical training, particularly due to the shortage of skilled surgeons. By creating highly realistic and interactive virtual environments, VR simulations have potential to enhance surgical skills, improve patient safety, and reduce training costs. A 2020 study compared the performance of experienced and less experienced surgeons in a VR simulation for spine surgery. The results indicated that novice surgeons who underwent VR training were able to identify and correct errors more effectively than those who relied solely on traditional training methods. VR simulations offer a potentially cost-effective and efficient training method. While traditional methods, such as cadaver labs and physical simulations, require significant resources, VR simulations can be accessed remotely and customized to individual needs.

=== Surgery, therapy and rehabilitation for patients ===
==== VR Use in Surgery ====
VR can produce a three-dimensional representation of a particular patient's anatomy that allows surgeons to map out the surgery ahead of time. This can be used in neurosurgery, allowing neurosurgeons to design a surgical procedure tailored to the patient prior to the operation which enhances surgical success. The first collaborative virtual reality surgery was successfully performed in June 2022, in Brazil by pediatric surgeon Noor Ul Owase Jeelani, of Great Ormond Street Hospital in London. The surgery, a separation of conjoined twins, was conducted collaboratively in a "virtual reality room" by Dr. Jeelani and Dr. Gabriel Mufarrej, head of paediatric surgery at Instituto Estadual do Cerebro Paulo Niemeyer in Brazil.

Similarly, experts examined the state of virtual reality (VR) in surgical education today, emphasizing its advantages for patient safety (e.g., electrosurgical procedures), nontechnical skills (e.g., teamwork), and technical skills (e.g., laparoscopy). The conference's objectives were to evaluate the potential of VR simulation technology for surgical training and provide best practices for its application. They found that VR simulation can make it easier for surgeons to an airtight space and an area with proper ventilation. VR simulation can also teach surgeons about safety factors and about the importance of breaks and factors leading to potential failures and problems.

==== VR Use in Therapy ====
Virtual reality exposure therapy (VRET) is a form of exposure therapy for treating anxiety disorders such as post-traumatic stress disorder (PTSD) and phobias. Studies have indicated that by combining VRET with behavioral therapy, patients experience a reduction of symptoms. In some cases, patients no longer met the DSM-5 criteria for PTSD.

Virtual reality has also been tested in the field of behavioral activation (BA) therapy. BA therapy encourages patients to change their mood by scheduling positive activities into their day-to-day life. Due to a lack of access to trained providers, physical constraints or financial reasons, many patients are not able to attend BA therapy. Researchers are trying to overcome these challenges by providing BA therapy via virtual reality, enabling patients, especially elderly adults, to engage in activities that they would not be able to attend without VR. Possibly, the so-called "BA-inspired VR protocols" can improve mood, life satisfaction, and likelihood of depression.

A VR therapy has been designed to help people with psychosis and agoraphobia manage their avoidance of outside environments. In the therapy, users wear a headset, and a virtual character provides psychological advice and guides them as they explore simulated environments (such as a café or a busy street). The National Institute for Health and Care Excellence (NICE) is assessing the therapy to see if it should be recommended on the National Health Service (NHS).

Another mentioned area of VR therapy is the treatment of eating disorders and body image disorders. Individuals can make your own body image by having a subject embody avatars with different characteristics. With this, people can practice handling these stressful situations and simulate and practice, such as grocery shopping or observing one's own body in the mirror. According to Mittal Himani, "Virtual Reality Distraction Therapy provides many levels of interactions to patients allowing the use of many senses thus encouraging them to be immersed in the virtual world experience. The higher the user's immersion means more attention in the virtual world and less attention to other signals of pain. A research study using VR as a distraction intervention was conducted in 2 sessions over a period of 8 weeks with 28 participants."

==== VR Use in Rehabilitation ====
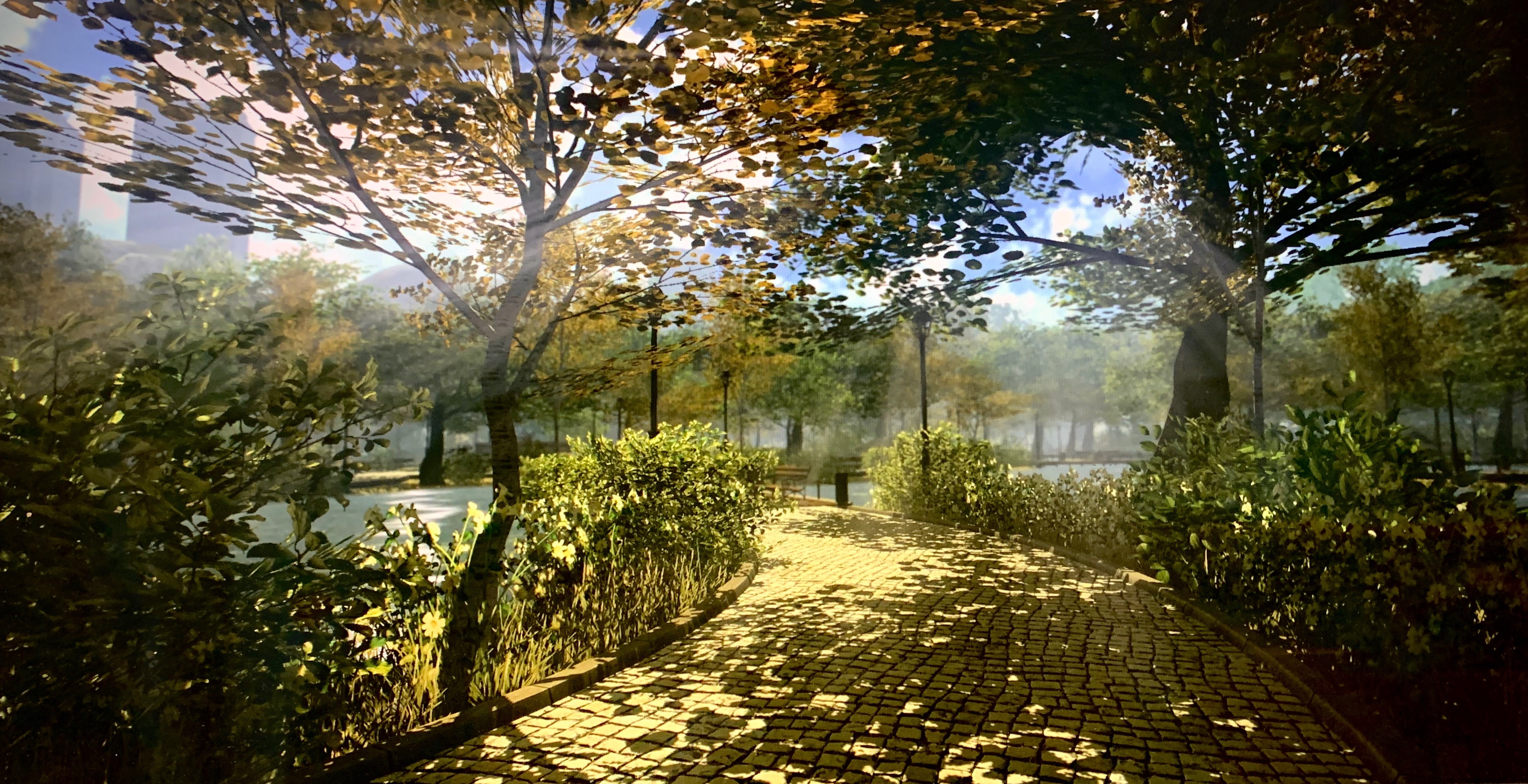
Immersive VR environment, used to motivate senior citizens to exercise regularly, by driving along the path and exploring the nature surroundings.

Immersive VR can motivate exercise with challenged sedentary users, applicable in rehabilitation centers or senior citizen homes, increasing users' quality of life and independence through increased physical activity. In particular, some companies and researchers are adapting VR for fitness, motivating physical therapy or exercise, either by contextualizing, like biking through VR-based experiences (see right image), or by using gamification to encourage exercise. Immersive VR has also been shown useful for acute pain management, on the theory that it may distract people, reducing their experience of pain.

Research has shown that dementia patients given virtual reminiscence therapy experienced reduced incidences of dementia related symptoms. Virtual reminiscence therapy creates virtual environments tailored to the patient, allowing them to remember old memories more easily, which may improve overall quality of life.

However, for some diseases like Parkinson's disease, evidence of its benefits compared to other rehabilitation methods is lacking. A 2018 review on the effectiveness of VR mirror therapy and robotics found no significant benefit.

Other than directly using VR in therapy, medical researchers are also using VR to study different conditions, for instance, researchers have leveraged VR to investigate how people with social anxiety learn and make decisions. Ultimately, researchers aim to better understand medical conditions, in order to improve medical intervention and therapy.

== Digital marketing ==
Virtual reality presents an opportunity and an alternative channel for digital marketing. The International Data Corporation expected spending to increase for augmented reality (AR) and virtual reality, forecasting a compound annual growth rate of 198% from 2015 to 2020. Revenues were expected to rise to $143.3 billion in 2020. Global spending on digital advertisements was forecasted to increase to $335.5 billion by 2020. A 2015 study found that 75% of companies on Forbes' World's Most Valuable Brands list had developed a VR or AR experience. Although VR is not widespread among consumers compared to other forms of digital media, many companies have invested in VR. Some companies adopted VR to enhance workplace collaboration.

VR can present high definition, three-dimensional interactive imaging. The benefits of VR marketing were observed by Suh and Lee through via laboratory experiments: with a VR interface, participants' emotions were engaged, and their product knowledge and product attitude noticeably increased. Both studies indicate an increased desire to purchase products marketed through VR. However, these benefits showed minimal return on investment (ROI). Suh and Lee found that products primarily experienced through hearing and vision (but not other senses) benefit more from VR marketing.

Advertisements that appear during a VR experience (interruption marketing) may be considered invasive. Consumers can choose whether they wish to accept an ad. To mitigate this, organizations can require the user to download a mobile app before experiencing their VR campaign.

Non-profit organizations have used VR to bring potential supporters closer to distant social, political and environmental issues in immersive ways not possible with traditional media. Panoramic views of the conflict in Syria and face-to-face encounters with computer-generated imagery (CGI) tigers in Nepal are some examples.

Retailers can use VR to show how a product will fit in consumers' homes. Consumers looking at digital photos of the products can virtually spin the product to view it from the side or back.

Architectural design firms can allow clients to tour virtual models of proposed or existing buildings to market their product, replacing scale models or floor plans with VR models.

== Education and training ==
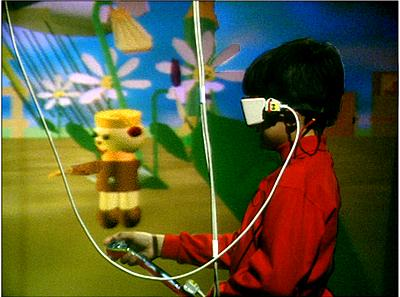
A photo of a student using the NICE project, an educational VR system from the 1990s.

VR is used to help learners develop skills without the real-world consequences of failing, especially useful in realms with life-or-death implications. The specific device used to provide the VR experience, whether it be through a mobile phone or desktop computer, does not appear to impact the educational benefits received by the learner.

In recent case studies, the VR training approach not only leads to better understandings, but also higher satisfaction amongst individuals. The number of errors can be reduced and the completion time for specific tasks can be shortened.

An increasing number of companies rely on virtual reality when it comes to onboarding of employees. VR onboarding is cheaper and more efficient compared to conventional training, as no demo equipment is required.

=== Aerospace and vehicular training ===
NASA has used VR technology for decades, the most notable being their use of immersive VR to train astronauts before flights. VR simulations include exposure to zero-gravity work environments, training on how to spacewalk and tool usage using low-cost tool mock-ups.

Flight simulators are another form of VR training. They can range from a fully enclosed module to computer monitors providing the pilot's point of view. Driving simulations can train tank drivers on the basics before allowing them to operate the real vehicle. Similar principles are applied in truck driving simulators for specialized vehicles such as fire trucks. As these drivers often have limited opportunity for real-world experience, VR training provides additional training time.

=== High school and college education ===
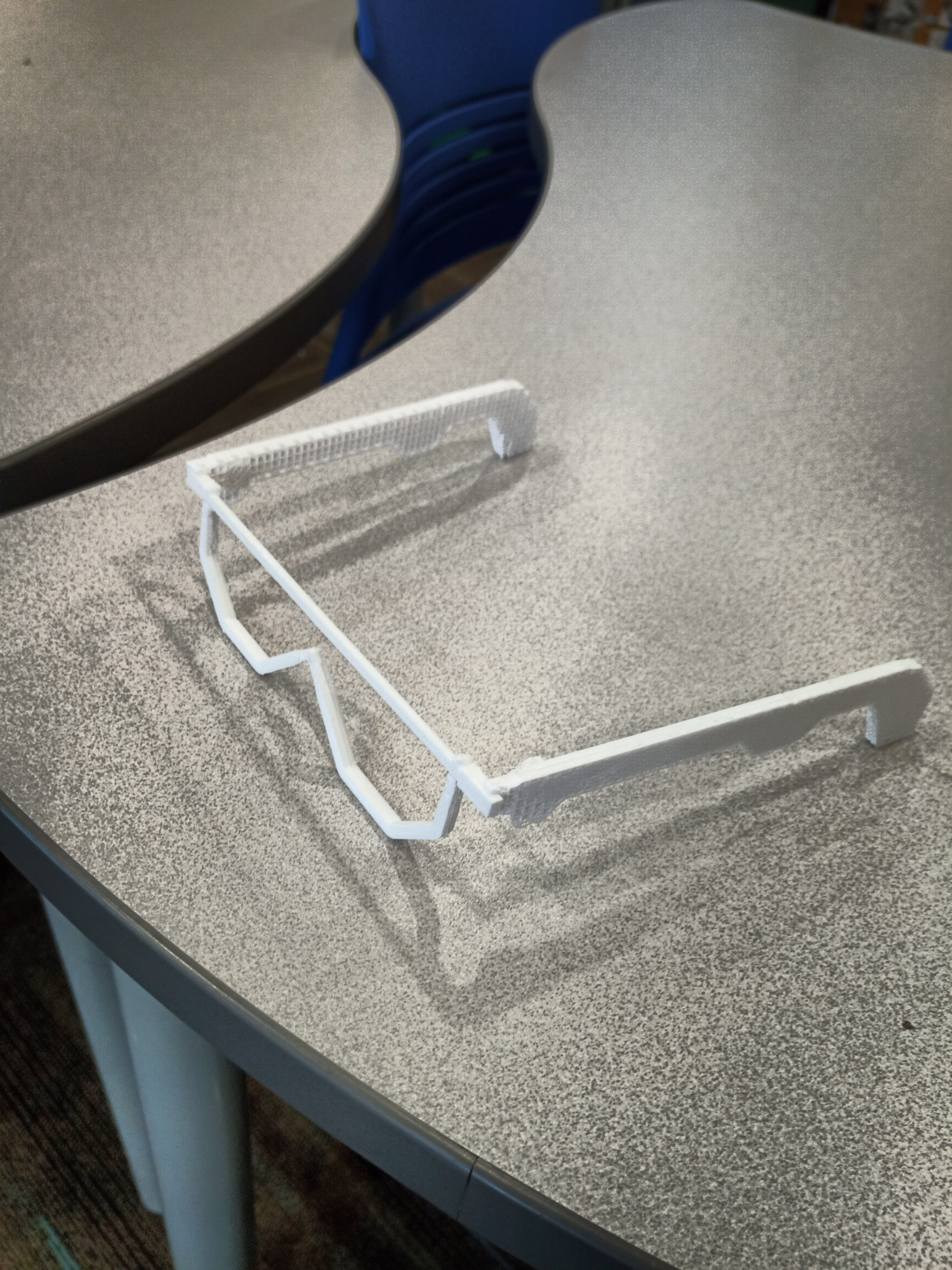
3d printed glasses created through VR.

Immersive VR can be used as a tool in the high school classroom to help students learn and be immersed in their subject matter. Immersive VR has been used to teach students interactively for both humanities subjects like history and STEM subjects like physics. VR laboratories have been set in up in some schools to provide students with immersive VR experiences focused on specific curriculum outcomes and subject matter. Through VR mediums such as Google Cardboard, foreign languages have also been taught in the classroom by teachers. These few examples showcase some of the applications of VR in the secondary classroom.

At the collegiate level, VR is also being applied to help enhance student education in core subjects such as science, geography, and history.

=== Medical training ===
Virtual reality (VR) technology has emerged as a significant tool in medical training and education. Specifically, there has been a major leap in innovation in surgical simulation and surgical real-time enhancement. Studies done at North Carolina medical institutions have demonstrated improvement in technical performance and skills among medical students and active surgeons using VR training as compared to traditional training, especially in procedures such as total hip arthroplasty. Alongside this, other VR simulation programs, improve basic coordination, instrument handling, and procedure-based skills. These simulations aim to have high ratings for feedback and haptic touch, which provides a more realistic surgical feel.

Studies show significant improvement in task completion time and scores after 4-week training sessions. This simulation environment also allows surgeons to practice without risk to real patients, promoting patient safety.

Based on data from research conducted by the University Hospitals Schleswig-Holstein and collaborators from other institutions, medical students and surgeons with years of experience, show marked performance boosts after practicing with VR technology.

Another recent study at North Carolina University of Chapel Hill has shown that developing VR systems has allowed for laparoscopic imaging integration, real-time skin layer visualization, and enhanced surgical precision capabilities.

These are examples of how studies have shown surgeons can take advantage of additional virtual reality simulation practices, which can create incredible experiences, provide customized scenarios, and provide independent learning with haptic feedback. These VR systems need to be realistic enough for education tools alongside being able to measure the performance of a surgeon.

Other studies in VR have used VR to improve Type and Screen (T&S) procedural training for medical practitioners, addressing the challenges of traditional training methods. T&S is critical for blood typing and antibody screening to ensure patient safety during transfusions. The traditional training method is "See One, Do One, Teach One" or SODOTO, which tends to fall short due to a limited amount of teachers and resources. In order to tackle this problem, a VR-based training program was created and developed using Unity3D, allowing surgeons to train through an effective, safe, and repeatable alternative. This VR system came with a head-mounted display and Leap Motion Controller, which simulated a hospital environment. There was also full equipment, procedures, and realistic blood drawing and sterilization. Additionally, error notifications and progress reports enhanced this training experience. The three main factors that were studied through this experiment were content, motivation, and readiness, and the statistical analysis throughout this study confirmed strong correlations between these factors and the program's reliability and impact. This is one of the many cases where combining VR with traditional training can really enhance practical skills and prepare surgeons for their future.

In 2017 there was a study done on the VR platforms Oculus and Gear VR, to evaluate their effectiveness in teaching medical and health science students about spinal anatomy. It examined the performance of student perceptions and the potential side effects associated with each device. While there are a lot of benefits to using VR technology, there are also some adverse effects such as nausea and blurred vision. Especially he participants using the Gear VR technology. This group ended up experiencing up to 40% more issues compared to the Oculus Rift group. Even with many drawbacks, this study concluded that mobile-based Gear VR was a cost-effective alternative to Oculus Rift, and that even with mobile VR devices, medical students can train for a more practical and affordable price.

Some potential future challenges of this technology would be enhancing complex scenarios alongside the realism aspects. These technologies would need to incorporate stress-inducing factors along with other realistic simulation ideas. Furthermore, there would be a strong need to keep things cost-effective with an abundance of availability.

=== Military training ===
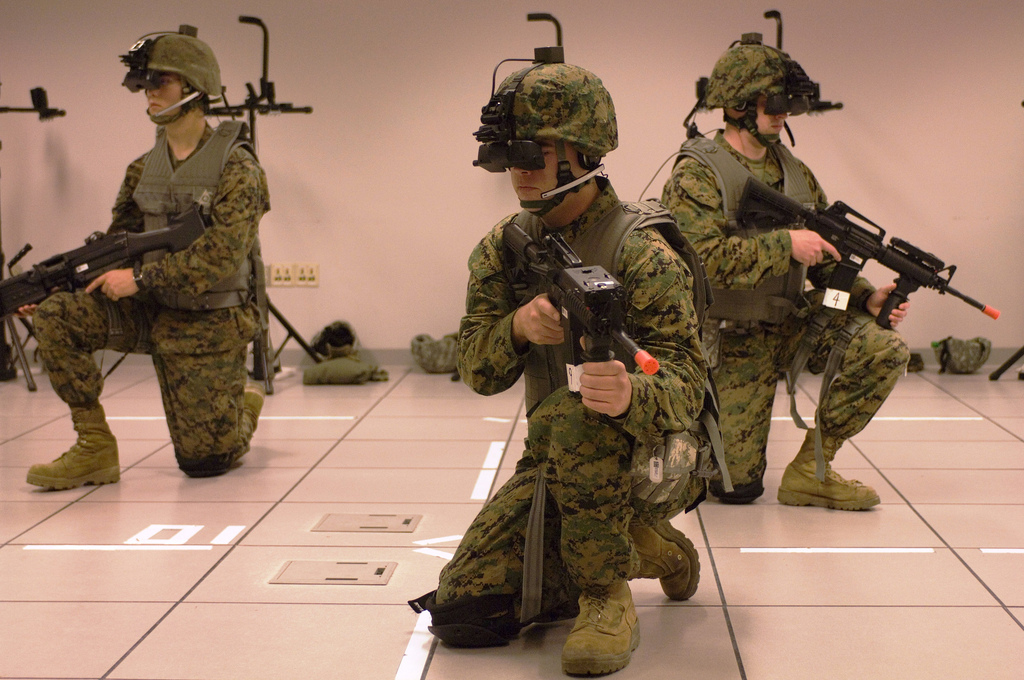
U.S. Marines from 2nd Battalion, 8th Marine Regiment walk through a scenario during a Future Immersive Training Environment (FITE) joint capability technology demonstration at Camp Lejeune in 2010.

In 1982, Thomas A. Furness III presented the United States Air Force with a working model of his virtual flight simulator, the Visually Coupled Airborne Systems Simulator (VCASS). The second phase of his project, which he called the "Super Cockpit", added high-resolution (for the time) graphics and a responsive display. The United Kingdom has been using VR in military training since the 1980s. The United States military announced the Dismounted Soldier Training System in 2012. It was cited as the first fully immersive military VR training system.

Virtual training environments have been claimed to increase realism while minimizing costs, for example, by saving ammunition. In 2016, researchers at the U.S. Army Research Laboratory reported that instructor feedback is necessary for virtual training. Virtual training has been used for combined arms training and instructing soldiers to learn when to shoot.

Military programs such as Battle Command Knowledge Systems (BCKS) and Advanced Soldier Sensor Information and Technology (ASSIST) were intended to assist the development of virtual technology. Described goals of the ASSIST initiative were to develop software and wearable sensors for soldiers to improve battlefield awareness and data collection. Researchers stated that these programs would allow the soldier to update their virtual environment as conditions change. Virtual Battlespace 3 (VBS3, successor to the earlier versions named VBS1 and VBS2) is a widely used military training solution adapted from a commercial off the shelf product. Live, Virtual, Constructive – Integrated Architecture (LVC-IA) is a U.S. military technology that allows for multiple training systems to work together to create an integrated training environment. Reported primary uses of the LVC-IA were live training, virtual training, and constructive training. In 2014, the LVC-IA version 1.3 included VBS3.

=== Mining industry training ===
Many mining accidents can be attributed to inadequate or insufficient training. With VR training, one may simulate the exposure to a real working environment, without the associated risk.

=== Sports training ===
VR headsets have been used in the training of athletes, such as in American football, when player Jayden Daniels used a Cognilize VR system at Louisiana State University and Washington Commanders. Additionally, virtual reality combined with machine learning techniques is utilized to train executive functions and improve decision-making performance in team sports such as basketball.

== Engineering and robotics ==
In the mid-to-late 1990s, 3D computer-aided design (CAD) data took over when video projectors, 3D tracking, and computer technology enabled its use in VR environments. Active shutter glasses and multi-surface projection units appeared. VR has been used in automotive, aerospace, and ground transportation original equipment manufacturers. VR aids prototyping, assembly, service and performance use-cases. This enables engineers from different disciplines to experience their design. Engineers can view the bridge, building or other structure from any angle. Simulations allow engineers to test their structure's resistance to winds, weight, and other elements.

Besides, VR can control robots in telepresence, teleoperation and telerobotic systems. VR has been used in experiments that investigate how robots can be applied as an intuitive human user interface. Another example is remotely controlled robots in dangerous environments.

Smart Manufacturing (SmartMFG), also referred to as Industry 4.0, represents the latest advancement in manufacturing technologies, integrating automation and data exchange. According to the National Institute of Standards and Technology (NIST), SmartMFG involves fully integrated collaborative manufacturing systems that respond in real-time to changing demands and conditions. At its core, SmartMFG incorporates cyber-physical systems (CPS) and the Internet of Things (IoT) to seamlessly connect data across different stages of the manufacturing process. The rise of 3D printing, coupled with SmartMFG, allows for the production of unique, cost-effective products without increased lead time. The incorporation of AR technologies further enhances SmartMFG, providing tools for human-machine interaction (HMI). AR devices offer safety improvements and reduce physical demands on workers in production plants, guiding users in a virtual environment. This technology facilitates the design and customization of products within the SmartMFG framework, increasing interaction complexity and supporting manual data input (MDI) systems.

== Entertainment ==
=== Video games ===
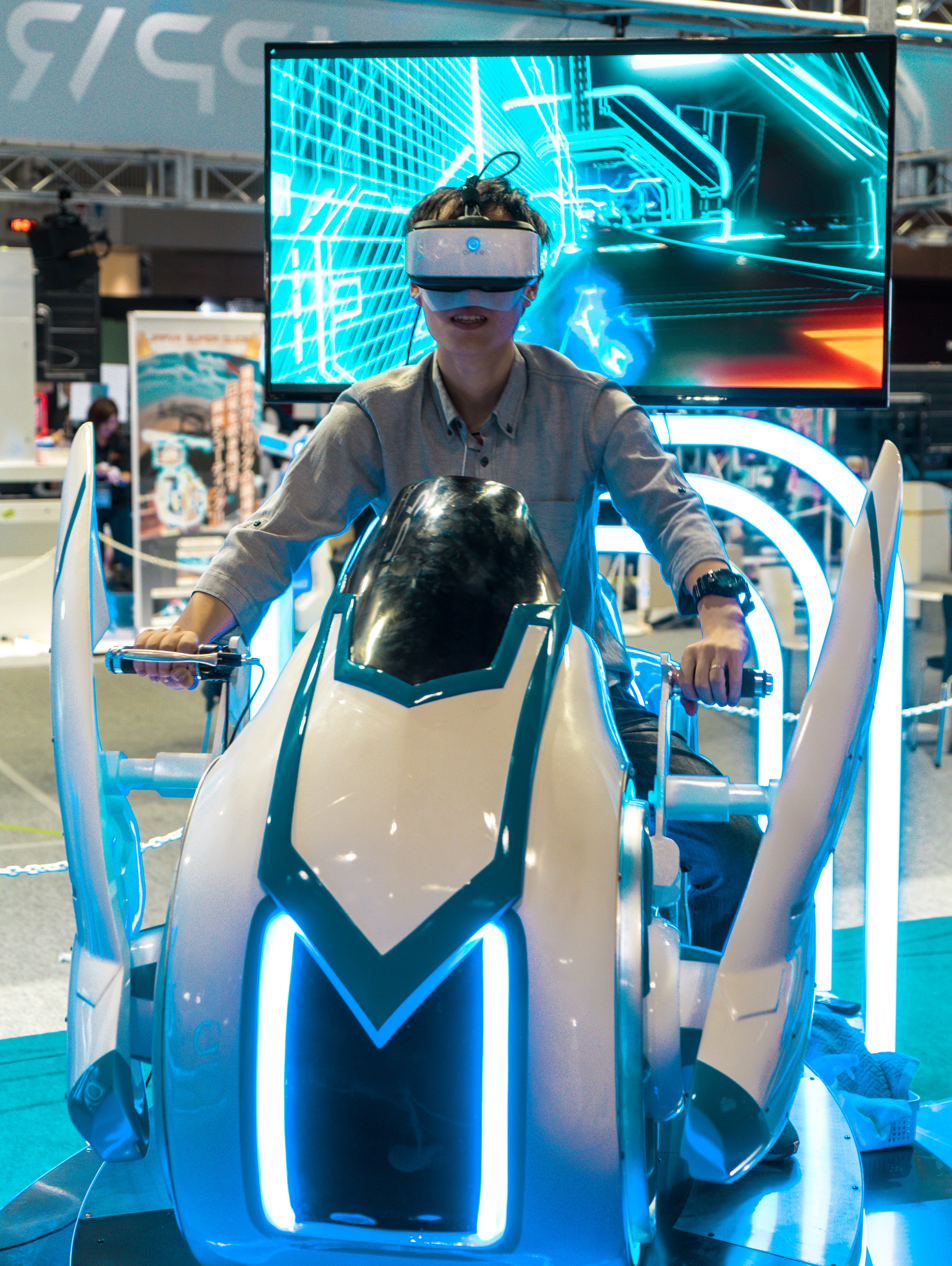
A man plays a virtual reality video game at Tokyo Game Show 2018.

Early commercial virtual reality headsets were released for gaming during the early-mid 1990s. These included the Virtual Boy, iGlasses, Cybermaxx and VFX1 Headgear. Since 2010, commercial headsets for VR gaming include the Oculus Rift, HTC Vive and PlayStation VR. The Samsung Gear VR is an example of a phone-based device.

Other modern examples of VR for gaming include the Wii Remote, the Kinect, and the PlayStation Move/PlayStation Eye, all of which track and send player motions to the game. Many devices complement VR with controllers or haptic feedback. VR-specific and VR versions of popular video games have been released.

=== Cinema ===
Films produced for VR permit the audience to view scenes in 360 degrees. This can involve the use of VR cameras to produce interactive films and series. Pornography makers use VR, usually for POV-style porn. In 2015, Disney was one of the first to include 360-content in popular culture, utilising the Nokia OZO camera to film 360 degrees videos for The Jungle Book (2016 film) and create VR content.

The 2016 World Chess Championship match between Magnus Carlsen and Sergey Karjakin was promoted as "the first in any sport to be broadcast in 360-degree virtual reality." However, a VR telecast featuring Oklahoma hosting Ohio State, preceded it on September 17, 2016. The telecasts (which used roughly 180 degrees of rotation, not the 360 required for full VR) were made available through paid smartphone apps and head-mounted displays.

=== Music ===
VR can allow individuals to virtually attend concerts, these VR concerts can be enhanced using feedback from the user's heartbeat and brainwaves. VR can also be used for music videos and music visualization or visual music applications. Immersive audio technologies, such as the Nokia OZO, can create an immersive listening experience. through head-tracking and precise directivity of sound.

=== Family entertainment centers ===
In 2015, roller coasters and theme parks began to incorporate VR to match visual effects with haptic feedback. The Void is a theme park in Pleasant Grove, Utah, that offers VR attractions that stimulate multiple senses. In March 2018, a VR water slide was launched using a waterproof headset.

== Virtual communities ==
Large virtual communities and metaverse platforms have formed around social virtual worlds that can be accessed with VR technologies. Popular examples include VRChat, Horizon Worlds, Rec Room, and AltspaceVR, but also social virtual worlds that were originally developed without support for VR, for example Roblox.

Minecraft, which is considered a virtual community by some, does not support VR but can be made to do so through modding.

== Fine arts ==
David Em was the first fine artist to create navigable virtual worlds, in the 1970s. His early work was done on mainframes at Information International, Inc., Jet Propulsion Laboratory, and California Institute of Technology. Jeffrey Shaw with Legible City in 1988 and Matt Mullican with Five into One in 1991, were among the first to exhibit elaborate VR artworks.

Virtopia was the first VR artwork to premiere at a film festival. Created by artist and researcher Jacquelyn Ford Morie with researcher Mike Goslin, it debuted at the 1992 Florida Film Festival. A more developed version of the project appeared at the 1993 Florida Film Festival. Other artists to explore the early artistic potential of VR through the 1990s include Jeffrey Shaw, Ulrike Gabriel, Char Davies, Maurice Benayoun, Knowbotic Research, Rebecca Allen and Perry Hoberman.

The first Canadian virtual reality film festival was the FIVARS Festival of International Virtual & Augmented Reality Stories, founded in 2015 by Keram Malicki-Sánchez. In 2016, the first Polish VR program, The Abakanowicz Art Room was realized – it documented the art office of Magdalena Abakanowicz, made by Jarosław Pijarowski and Paweł Komorowski. Some museums have begun making some of their content virtual reality accessible including the British Museum and the Guggenheim.

Great Paintings VR is a fully immersive virtual reality museum on Steam. It provides more than 1000 famous paintings from different museums of all over the world.

== Heritage and archaeology ==
Virtual reality enables heritage sites to be recreated. The sites may be restricted or provide no access for the public, such as caves, damaged or destroyed structures, or sensitive environments that are closed to allow them to recover from overuse.

The first use of VR in a heritage application was in 1994, when a museum provided visitors an interactive "walk-through" of a 3D reconstruction of Dudley Castle in England as it was in 1550. This consisted of a computer-controlled laserdisc-based system designed by engineer Colin Johnson. The system was featured in a conference held by the British Museum in November 1994.

== Occupational safety ==
VR simulates real workplaces for occupational safety and health (OSH) purposes. Within work scenarios, for example, some parts of a machine move of their own accord while others can be moved by human operators. Perspective, angle of view, and acoustic and haptic properties change according to where the operator is standing and how he or she moves relative to the environment.

VR can be used for OSH purposes to:

- Review and improve the usability of products and processes during design and development.
- Safely test potentially hazardous products, processes and safety concepts.
- Identify cause-effect relationships following accidents on and involving products. This saves material, personnel, time and financial outlay associated with in-situ testing.

== Social science and psychology ==
Virtual reality offers social scientists and psychologists a cost-effective tool to study and replicate interactions in a controlled environment. It allows an individual to embody an avatar. "Embodying" another being presents a different experience from simply imagining that you are someone else. Researchers have used immersion to investigate how digital stimuli can alter human perception, emotion and physiological states, and how can change social interactions, in addition to studying how digital interaction can enact social change in the physical world.

=== Altering perception, emotion and physiological states ===
Studies have considered how the form we take in virtual reality can affect our perception and actions. One study suggested that embodying the body of a child can cause objects to be perceived as much larger than otherwise. Another study found that white individuals who embodied the form of a dark-skinned avatar performed a drumming task with a more varied style than otherwise.

Research exploring perception, emotions and physiological responses within VR suggest that virtual environments can alter how a person responds to stimuli. For example, a virtual park coupled affects subjects' anxiety levels. Similarly, simulated driving through dark areas in a virtual tunnel can induce fear. Social interaction with virtual characters has been shown to produce physiological responses such as changes in heart rate and galvanic skin responses.

Research suggests that a strong presence can facilitate an emotional response, and this emotional response can further increase the feeling of presence. Similarly, breaks in the presence (or a loss in the sense of presence) can cause physiological changes.

=== Understanding biases and stereotypes ===
Researchers have utilized embodied VR perspective-taking to evaluate whether changing a person's self-representation may help in reducing bias against particular social groups. However, the nature of any relationship between embodiment and bias is not yet defined. Individuals who embodied old people demonstrated a significant reduction in negative stereotyping when compared with individuals embodying young people. Similarly, light-skinned individuals placed in dark-bodied avatars showed a reduction in their implicit racial bias. However, other research has shown individuals taking the form of a black avatar had higher levels of implicit racial bias favoring whites after leaving the virtual environment.

=== Investigating basal mental abilities ===
One of the most general abilities in order to perform in everyday life is spatial cognition, which involves orientation, navigation etc. Especially in the field of its investigation, virtual reality became an invaluable tool, since it allows to test the performance of subjects in an environment which is highly immersive and controllable at the same time.

Furthermore, the newest head-mounted displays allow also the implementation of eye-tracking, which provides precious insight in cognitive processes, for example in terms of attention.

=== Fostering the human grieving process ===
Starting in the early 2020s, virtual reality has also been discussed as a technological tool that may support people's grieving process, based on digital recreations of deceased individuals. In 2021, this practice received particular media attention following a South Korean TV documentary, which invited a grieving mother to interact with a virtual replica of her deceased daughter. Subsequently, scientists have debated several potential implications of such endeavors, including its potential to facilitate adaptive mourning behavior, but also the many ethical challenges involved.

== Animal Agriculture ==
Some researchers in intensive animal farming have explored the idea of placing virtual reality headsets on farm animals. Concepts have been proposed for both chickens and cattle. Others have explored the idea of using virtual reality with humans to kill animals or perform other slaughterhouse work remotely. Both uses are controversial

In 2019, a story over a Russian dairy farm testing VR on cows went viral, thought it is not fully clear if this occurred as shown in viral photos. The reported aim was to decrease stress by showing images of pasture in the VR googles. They claimed milk yields increased. Many researchers in the area are skeptical of these claims. They noted that the pressure from googles themselves would likely increase stress. Cattle vision optics are different to humans, making headsets unlikely to work without modification. They also argued that many of the cows had never seen pasture making it unlikely for them to have an emotional response to the visual alone without the other sensory input.

The concept has faced criticism from researchers, members of the general public, and animal rights and animal welfare groups. Many researchers are skeptical of the claimed benefits, the lack of scientific rigor or study details in previous attempts, and argue it may increase stress. Members of the public on social media alongside groups such as world animal protection have compared the practice to the matrix, with some satirically calling it "the Mootrix". Mercy for Animals has criticized the potential uses of VR in slaughterhouses. They said it would "turn butchering animals into a kind of gruesome video game" and that it wouldn't make conditions any better for farm animals.

== Obstacles ==
As of 1997, motion sickness is still a major issue for virtual reality, caused by the delay between a motion and the updating of the screen image. Users often report discomfort, for example, one study reported that all 12 participants complained of at least two side effects, while three had to withdraw from severe nausea and dizziness.

Along with motion sickness, users can also become distracted by the new technology hardware. A study showed how when VR was incorporated into a laboratory environment, the students felt more engaged with the concept, but retained less information due to the new distraction.

Additionally, virtual reality users "remove" themselves from their physical environment. This creates a risk that the user will experience a mishap while moving. The Russian news agency, TASS, reported a death from VR use in 2017, when a 44-year-old man "tripped and crashed into a glass table, suffered wounds and died on the spot from a loss of blood". It is thought to be the first death from VR use. Besides, immersion in a virtual world may potentially lead to social exclusion, which may decrease positive mood and increase anger. Some researchers believe that users' behavior in virtual reality may have a lasting psychological impact when they return to the physical world.

Philosopher David Pearce argues that even with the most sophisticated VR, "there is no evidence that our subjective quality of life would on average significantly surpass the quality of life of our hunter-gatherer ancestors". According to Pearce, without genetically reprogramming the negative feedback mechanisms of the brain, one returns to one's baseline level of happiness or ill-being, which is determined by one's genes and life history. He thus argues that VR, like any other "purely environmental improvement", cannot deliver a sustainable level of elevated happiness on its own.
