= Upload (disambiguation) =

Upload refers to transferring a file to or from another computer.

Upload may also refer to:

- Mind uploading, the hypothetical transfer of a human mind into a computer by brain emulation
- Upload (TV series), an American science fiction comedy web television series premiered on May 1, 2020.
- Upload, Inc. (formerly UploadVR, Inc.) was an American virtual reality-focused technology and media company based in Marina del Rey, California.
