= Southwest Florida Eagle Cam =

Birdwatching website

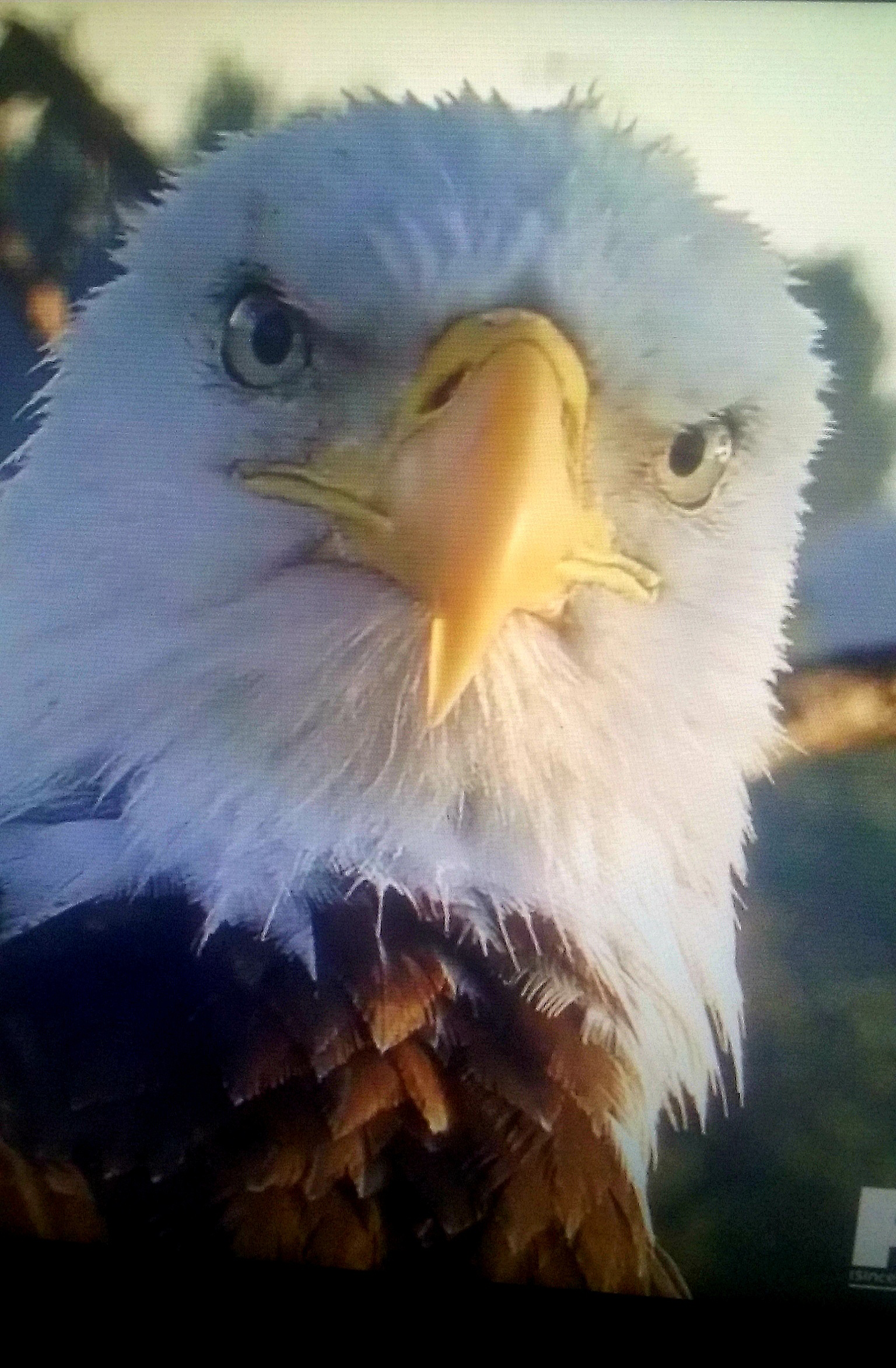
Harriet, the matriarch of the bald eagle nest in North Fort Myers, Florida, looking directly at the live-streaming webcam on January 21, 2017

The Southwest Florida Eagle Cam (SWFEC) is a website and YouTube channel featuring live streaming webcams trained on a bald eagle nest, which sits 60 feet above the ground, in a slash pine tree in North Fort Myers, Florida. Live streaming, accompanied by explanatory commentary, shows the parent eagles and their family as they build and restore the nest, mate, lay eggs, and challenge the natural elements and predators in the area. SWFEC achieved a technological "world first" with its installation, in 2016, of a spherical virtual reality-enabled camera offering an immersive, interactive nature experience.

The website launched in September 2012 with one camera, set up by the Pritchett family, natives of southwest Florida, on the property of Dick Pritchett Real Estate. The aim was to let the viewing public observe the eagles in their natural habitat while getting an educational and learning experience. Today, the SWFEC has four cameras, monitored by dedicated volunteers, and is one of the most popular among dozens of bald-eagle nest webcam sites across America. Between 2012 and 2025, the SWFEC has received over 350 million views from more than 190 countries.

== Nest ==
This nest was labeled LE026-B of the Florida State Monitoring Program. It was monitored by the Florida Fish and Wildlife Conservation Commission (FWC) for six years. The first year was when the nest was across the street in 2007. The pair relocated the nest in 2006–2007 to its present location. The FWC officially stopped its intensive bald eagle monitoring program after the species' population recovered sufficiently to be removed from both the federal and state endangered species lists in 2007 and 2008, respectively. Since 2009, the volunteer-based Audubon EagleWatch program has become the primary source of ongoing, on-the-ground nest monitoring in Florida.

The bald eagle builds the largest nest of any North American bird. A typical bald eagle nest (or eyrie) is around five feet in diameter. Eagles often use the same nest year after year. Over the years, some nests become enormous, over eight feet in diameter, weighing more than a ton. A record-sized nest in St. Petersburg, Florida, was 9.5 feet in diameter and 20 feet tall. The SWFEC nest is approximately eight feet in diameter and a short one-mile flight away from the Caloosahatchee River, which serves as their primary food source; a pond on the property serves as an additional source. The eagles rely mostly on fish from the river (Mullet, Catfish, Red Fish, Snook, Gar), but may also eat small rodents, such as squirrels, if the opportunity presents itself.

According to the FWC, which tracked bald eagle nests at the time when the SWFEC nest was home to its most famous residents, M15 and Harriet, the pair had 133 neighbors in a 25-mile radius; their closest neighbor was one mile away.

== Cameras ==
To preserve the natural habitat of the eagles, the first nest-viewing camera was positioned six feet above the nest, attached to a tree limb, using no screws or nails. The noiseless camera also uses night vision (infrared light), allowing viewers to see eagles at night without disturbing them. Since the second season, an additional overhead, or approach, camera has provided a wider view of the area. Two more cameras have been added during later seasons.

Currently, the four cameras are located as follows:

- Cam 1: nest-viewing camera, positioned seven feet above the nest; faces South East.
- Cam 2: located at nest level, capturing the side-view action; faces North East.
- Cam 3: a 360-degree camera that provides a spherical view of the nest and its surroundings; installed in 2016, it was the world's first spherical-view camera to broadcast a live stream using virtual reality technology for an immersive, interactive nature experience. The camera can be controlled by viewers using their mouse (desktop) or fingers (mobile) to click and drag; it can also be viewed and controlled via a virtual reality headset.
- Cam 4: installed across the pond to capture activity in the pond area and around the nearby horse pasture.

Volunteers monitoring the cameras have worked with wildlife officials and local biologists to ensure the eagle’s safety and will not interfere with or intervene in any natural events in the nest. Extreme medical emergencies are handled by veterinary professionals.

The cameras stream live via the SWFEC website and YouTube channel.

== How individual eagles are identified ==
Male and female eagles are easily distinguishable: female bald eagles are noticeably larger than their male counterparts, a phenomenon called reversed sexual dimorphism. Individual eagles are distinguished from each other by "field marks" such as the size and line of the beak, the size of eye-rings, unique color patches, and posture, as well as behavioral cues and flight patterns.

Widespread naming convention used by moderators and dedicated viewers of eagle nest webcams for monitoring purposes is: E with a sequential number (indicating its order of hatch within the recording history, e.g., E19) for eaglet; F with a sequential number (the year when it was first observed, e.g., F23) for adult resident female eagle, and M with a sequential number (the year when it was first observed, e.g., M15) for adult resident male eagle. Designations like MV (male visitor) or FV (female visitor) are used for non-resident eagles that appear at the nest temporarily. The use of these structured alphanumeric identifiers helps chronicle the eagles' lives accurately and consistently across seasons and different platforms.

Anthropomorphizing the wild eagles with human names is usually reserved for birds with unique characteristics or unusual histories.

== Harriet and Ozzie ==
Bald eagles can live up to 30 years in the wild, reaching reproductive maturity at 4 to 5 years of age. They form lifelong pairs but will find a new partner if their original mate dies, often staying in the same territory and nest. During breeding season, bald eagles typically defend their territories from other birds of prey, as well as ravens, foxes, coyotes, and other intruders.

Harriet and Ozzie were named by the landowners and area birdwatchers who fell in love with the duo from a distance. Their names are based on the American sitcom The Adventures of Ozzie and Harriet. The pair nested in the Pritchett pine tree from 2006 to Ozzie's death in 2015, following a fight with another eagle. After having re-mated and raised eaglets with a new mate, M15, for eight more seasons, Harriet disappeared in February 2023. She was last seen vocalizing at intruders in the area. Her sudden vanishing shocked both the local and the online communities. Local news coverage was extensive. For weeks, volunteer search parties scoured the area for signs of her, but no trace was ever found. In May 2023, a memorial plaque for Harriet was installed on the fence of the nearby Church of the Nazarene. On anniversaries of Harriet's disappearance, SWFEC viewership and local media have continued to publish remembrances, treating Harriet as a regional cultural icon. As of 2025, her memorial plaque has remained at the site, next to plaques for her first mate, Ozzie, and several past eaglets.

A children's book, Ozzie and Harriet Build a Nest, was published in 2016.

== Nesting season history ==
In warmer regions like Florida, the nesting season for bald eagles is from October to May. The average egg incubation period for bald eagles is 34 to 36 days. Parents take turns incubating the eggs, turning them about once an hour to ensure the consistent warmth required for embryos to develop, until they sense movement and the chick begins to scratch its way out. Once the chick begins breathing, it produces soft calls that the adults can hear. The entire hatching process, from the first crack (pip) to full emergence, typically takes 24 to 48 hours.

While cameras were not set up to watch the activity before 2012, the following activity has been documented about the six initial nesting seasons:

- 2006/2007 Season: Two eaglets fledged.
- 2007/2008 Season: Fledglings not confirmed.
- 2008/2009 Season: Two eaglets.
- 2009/2010 Season: One eaglet.
- 2010/2011 Season: One fledgling confirmed.
- 2011/2012 Season: One fledgling confirmed.

Complete Nest Notes for all seasons starting February 13, 2013, are available on the SWFEC website and Facebook page. Informative online chats, as well as archived footage and screenshots with explanatory commentary, are also available via YouTube and Instagram. Below is a summary.

2012/2013 Season

The 2012–2013 season marked the first year the nest was streamed live. Over 16 million viewers tuned in to watch Harriet and Ozzie raise their two eaglets from birth to fledge. The eaglets were named Hope and Honor, the only ones to be named individually.

Hope/E1

- Egg laid: November 26, 2012, 1:47 pm
- Hatched: January 1, 2013, at 10:44 pm (day 36)
- Fledged: March 25, 2013, at 7:51 am (day 83)
- Last seen: May 9, 2013, at 8:35 pm (day 128, 45 days after fledging)

Honor/E2

- Egg laid: November 29, 2012, 6:38 pm
- Hatched: January 3, 2013, at 9:49 pm (day 35)
- Fledged: March 25, 2013, at 8:23 am (day 81)
- Last seen: May 16, 2013, at 8:45 am (day 133, 52 days after fledging)

2013/2014 Season

The 2013–2014 season brought many challenges to both the viewers and the eagles. Ozzie & Harriet returned to the nest in October and laid two eggs in November.

E3

- Egg laid: November 17, 2013, 4:37 pm
- Hatched: December 23, 2013, at 11:46 pm (day 36)
- E3 died February 2, 2014, at 4:53 am due to unknown causes (day 41)

E4

- Egg laid: November 20, 2013, 6:18 pm
- Hatched: December 25, 2013, at 10:21 am (day 35)
- Fledged: April 4, 2014, at 8:27 am (day 100)
- Last seen: May 8, 2014, at 7:00 am (day 134, 34 days after fledging)

2014/2015 Season

The 2014–2015 season marked the third year the nest was streamed live, this time with two high-definition cameras. Ozzie and Harriet returned to the nest in October and laid two eggs in November.

E5

- Egg laid: November 19, 2014
- Hatched: December 26, 2014 (day 37)
- E5 died January 20, 2015, at 10:15 pm due to unknown causes (day 25)

E6

- Egg laid: November 22, 2014
- Hatched: December 27, 2014 (day 35)
- Fledged: March 23, 2015 (day 86)
- Last seen: May 4, 2015, at 10:36 am (day 128, 42 days after fledging)

On March 17, 2015, Ozzie was found by FWC officials and taken to the Clinic for Rehabilitation of Wildlife (CROW) for evaluation after showing signs of disorientation and injury. After 97 days of care to recover from a broken left clavicle and a broken left coracoid bone, Ozzie was released back into the wild near the nest. On Saturday, September 19, Ozzie made an appearance at the nest. On September 27, after being seen fighting with a male eagle in the area, Ozzie was found injured and again admitted back into CROW's care. On Tuesday, September 29, 2015, Ozzie died.

2015/2016 Season

The 2015–2016 season was a season of many firsts for Harriet and her new mate, M15. After Ozzie's death, Harriet spent a few weeks courting possible new mates but eventually bonded with M15, laying two eggs.

E7

- Egg laid: December 19, 2015, at 4:25 pm
- Hatched: January 26, 2016, at 7:23 am (day 38)
- Fledged: April 16, 2016 (day 81)
- Last seen: May 24, 2016, at 10:30 am (day 119, 38 days after fledging)

E8

- Egg laid: December 22, 2015, at 5:40 pm
- Hatched: January 27, 2016, at 10:39 pm (day 36)
- Fledged: May 3, 2016 (day 97)
- Last seen: upon release by CROW after rehabilitation, August 18, 2016 (day 194, 97 days after fledging)

On February 9, 2015, E8 had to be cut free from the nest after getting monofilament fishing line wrapped around its leg and foot, cutting off circulation and causing swelling. E8 was taken to the CROW clinic for treatment and released back to the nest 3 days later. The young eaglets continued to thrive and develop into juvenile eagles, fledging the nest on April 16 (E7) and May 3 (E8). But, as the nest started to deteriorate, the eagles were attacked by an owl on May 7. E7 returned the next day, E8 did not, and was feared dead. On May 13, nearly a week after the attack, volunteers found E8 alive in a nearby neighborhood with a broken leg. E8 was admitted to CROW for a second time for rehabilitation and recovery. After nearly 3 months at CROW, E8 was released back into the wild on August 18.

2016/2017 Season

2016–2017 marked the second season Harriet and her new mate, M15, mated as a pair. The season started with much anticipation of whether the eagles would return as the old nest had been completely lost after the end of the last season. Luckily, Harriet and M15 returned to the area and got to work on repairing the nest in September; the nest was in great shape for the laying of their two eggs in November.

Egg #1 (was not viable and did not hatch)

- Egg laid: November 22, 2016, at 5:03 pm

E9

- Egg laid: November 25, 2016, at 6:13 pm
- Hatched: December 31, 2016, at 7:33 am (day 35)
- Fledged: accidentally on March 14, 2017, at 7:22 am (day 73)
- Last seen: May 2, 2017, at 10:00 am (day 122, 49 days after fledging)

Being the only eaglet in the nest, E9 thrived and grew on schedule, even setting a record for the earliest fledge when accidentally fledging on March 14 at 7:22 (age 73 days). Making a successful return to the nest after its first, accidental fledge, E9 stayed in or near the nest and was last seen in the nest area on May 2.

2017/2018 Season

The 2017–2018 season was the third year as a mated pair for Harriet and M15. Both eagles returned to the area in mid-August, working together to build up the nest before eggs were laid.

E10

- Egg laid: November 19, 2017
- Hatched: December 26, 2017 (day 37)
- Fledged: March 14, 2018 (day 68)
- Last seen: May 4, 2018, at 8:41 am (day 129, 51 days after fledging)

E11

- Egg laid: November 22, 2017
- Hatched: December 27, 2017 (day 35)
- Fledged: March 16, 2018 (day 79)
- Last seen: April 30, 2018, at 10:37 am (day 124, 45 days after fledging)

E10 and E11 hatched 19 hours apart. With just hours, and not days, between hatching, the siblings had a close bond and developed at a similar pace. Never far apart, they spent hours learning to hunt, fight, and survive in the wild.

2018/2019 Season

The 2018-2019 season was the fourth year as a mated pair for Harriet and M15 and the seventh year for the SWFEC streaming the nest live. Both eagles returned to the area in mid-August, working together to build up the nest before eggs were laid. Similar to the previous season, the siblings had a close bond and developed at a similar pace.

E12

- Egg laid: November 16, 2018
- Hatched: December 23, 2018 (day 37)
- Fledged: March 12, 2019 (day 79)
- Last seen: May 16, 2019, at 12:31 pm (day 144, 65 days after fledging)

E13

- Egg laid: November 19, 2018
- Hatched: December 24, 2018 (day 35)
- Fledged: March 14, 2019 (day 80)
- Last seen: April 25, 2019, at 10:58 am (day 122, 42 days after fledging)

2019/2020 Season

Although 2019-2020 was the fifth year as a mated pair for Harriet and M15, it was a season of many firsts for the duo. Viewers saw death, resilience, and new life, along with many new milestone records hit by eaglets E15 and E16.

E14

- Egg laid: November 12, 2019
- Hatched: December 19, 2019 (day 37)
- E14 died on January 15, 2020 (day 27)

Egg #2 (was not viable and did not hatch)

- Egg laid: November 16, 2019

E15

- Egg laid: February 22, 2020
- Hatched: March 31, 2020 (day 38)
- Fledged: June 15, 2020 (day 76)
- Last seen: November 2, 2020, at 9:13 am (day 216, 140 days after fledging)

E16

- Egg laid: February 25, 2020
- Hatched: April 2, 2020 (day 37)
- Fledged: July 1, 2020 (day 90)
- Last seen: August 8, 2020, at 10:17 am (day 128, 38 days after fledging)

E14 died on January 15, 2020 (cause of death: loss of blood caused by a broken blood feather). The liver tissue of E14 was found to contain markedly increased levels of brodifacoum, a type of anticoagulant rodenticide or rat poison. (Anticoagulant rodenticides, or rat poisons, prevent the blood from clotting normally and cause an animal that has ingested a toxic amount to bleed to death). The second 2019/2020 egg was laid on November 16, 2019, at 18:30 pm, but never hatched. It was removed from the nest on January 15, when CROW removed the remains of E14. CROW determined that the egg had been fertilized, but the embryo stopped developing.

2020/2021 Season

On January 29, 2021, E17 and E18 were removed from the nest by CROW when concern for the eaglet's health was noticed: their eyes were swollen and crusty. (Results of E17 and E18 eye swabs performed by CROW came back positive for avian chlamydiosis. Avian chlamydiosis is a bacterial disease caused by Chlamydophila psittaci (C. psittaci), which is commonly carried by birds.) E17 and E18 were re-nested by CROW on February 5, 2021, at 9:41 am. Harriet returned to the nest at 2:38 pm, and M15 returned at 4:02 pm. Food was brought to the nest on February 6, 2021, at 8:41 am. Thanks to the work by veterinarians, nest monitors, and wildlife rehabilitators, the eaglets were returned to their nest healthy and have continued to grow and thrive.

E17

- Egg laid: December 16, 2020, at 4:58 pm
- Hatched: January 23, 2021, at 4:41 pm (day 38)
- Branched: March 26, 2021, at 8:42 am (day 62)
- Fledged: April 14, 2021, at 1:42 pm (day 81)
- Last seen: perched on the nest tree on May 23, 2021, at 8:28 pm (day 120, 39 days after fledging)

E18

- Egg laid: December 19, 2020, at 4:45 pm
- Hatched January 23, 2021, at 6:26 pm (day 35)
- Branched: March 27, 2021, at 10:13 am (day 63)
- Fledged: April 21, 2021, at 8:52 am (day 88)
- Last seen: flying north after leaving the nest tree on May 24, 2021, at 9:45 am (day 121, 33 days after fledging)

2021/2022 Season

E19

- Egg laid: November 20, 2021
- Hatched: December 27, 2021 (day 37)
- Branched: March 4, 2022 (day 67)
- Fledged: March 20, 2022 (day 83)
- Last seen: flying east on April 28, 2022, at 10:18 am (day 122, 39 days after fledging)

E20

- Egg laid: November 23, 2021
- Hatched: December 28, 2021 (day 35)
- Branched: March 6, 2022 (day 68)
- Fledged: March 22, 2022 (day 84)
- Last seen: flying south on May 18, 2022, at 9:55 am (day 141, 57 days after fledging)

2022/2023 Season

On September 28, 2022, a Category 4 hurricane, Hurricane Ian, destroyed the nest. Harriet and M15 left the nest prior to the storm's arrival and, upon returning, quickly rebuilt the nest. Two eggs were laid, and two eaglets hatched. On February 2, 2023, the beloved eagle matriarch, Harriet, was seen heading ENE and vocalizing at intruders in the area. She did not return to the nest.

Harriet's disappearance caused significant emotional distress within SWFEC's vast online community, with many viewers visiting the nest area. The SWFEC website received tens of thousands of messages of condolences and support. Over time, the focus shifted to M15's dedication to raising the young alone; both of them successfully fledged.

E21

- Egg laid: November 29, 2022, at 6:09 pm
- Hatched: January 4, 2023, at 8:22 pm (day 36)
- Branched: March 17, 2023, at 11:45 am (day 72)
- Fledged: March 30, 2023, at 7:28 am (day 84)
- Last seen: flying WNW on April 29, 2023, at 1:02 pm (day 115, 31 days after fledging)

E22 (Harriet's last eaglet)

- Egg laid: December 2, 2022, at 8:09 pm
- Hatched: January 7, 2023, at 4:43 am (day 36)
- Branched: March 21, 2023, at 5:04 pm (day 73)
- Fledged: April 1, 2023, at 9:24 am (day 84)
- Last seen: flying north on June 10, 2023, at 9:59 am (day 154, 70 days after fledging)

=== Later History ===
2023/2024: Later in 2023, M15 bonded with a new female, F23, and they began raising eaglets together. They successfully raised and fledged their first offspring, E23, in the spring of 2024.

2024/2025: Their two eaglets, E24 and E25, both died from avian flu within days of each other in late January 2025. M15 and F23 also fell ill but recovered from the bird flu.

2025/2026: M15 and F23 returned to the nest for their third season as a pair. In November 2025, showing remarkable resilience after the tragic loss of their two eaglets in the previous season, they had produced two new eggs, laying them 12 to 15 days sooner than previous couples, Harriet and Ozzie, and Harriet and M15. E26 successfully hatched on December 18, 2025, and by December 21, it had already begun taking its first feedings of fish.

F23 went missing on February 27, 2026, and was presumed dead on March 3 after a body of a bald eagle was discovered 2 mi (3.2 km) from the nest location.

2025/2026 was the 14th season of the SWFEC, which has chronicled the lives of three bald eagle pairs, documenting the intense highs and lows of raising young in the wild.

== See also ==
- List of individual birds
- Birdwatching
- Bird of prey
