= DSKNECTD =

2013 American documentary film

- North America One Sheet
- Directed by: Dominic H. White
- Written by: Dominic H. White
- Produced by: Lucas Soto
- Narrated by: John Hunerlach
- Cinematography: Dominic H. White
- Edited by: Dominic H. White
- Music by: Burkhard Maria Fincke; Silas Gupta
- Distributed by: Gravitas Ventures (North America); Sideways Film (International)
- Release dates: October 11, 2013 (ArcLight); June 3, 2014
- Running time: 98 minutes
- Country: United States
- Language: English

DSKNECTD is a 2013 documentary directed by Dominic H. White. The film is an exploration of the rise of digital communication technologies, examining how cell phones, social media and the Internet are reshaping human interactions. The film had its sneak preview at the Tacoma Film Festival October 9, 2013 and its world premiere at the ArcLight Documentary Festival October 11, 2013.

== Synopsis ==
The documentary explores the positive and negative effects of cell phones, online gaming and the internet. The film examines the impact of these technologies from the introduction of texting via the BlackBerry 850, the creation of virtual worlds and MMORPGs like World of Warcraft, to the rise of Web 2.0 and easily accessible online pornography.

The body of the film includes interviews from researchers in the fields of neuroscience, psychology, child development and virtual reality including, Adam Gazzaley, Larry Rosen, Jacquelyn Ford Morie, Mary Helen Immordino-Yang and Kenneth Woog.

== Development ==
The film's title DSKNECTD is a play on the common practice in texting and chat to abbreviate words using a phonetic spelling. White developed the idea for the film over the course of several years after observing changes in the interactions he was having with long time friends as wide spread adoption of digital communication technologies occurred in the mid-2000s. Hearing others express similar experiences White decided to interview experts in various field to determine if the anecdotal evidence matched multidisciplinary scientific research.

The film includes re-enactments, man-on-the-street interviews and vignettes. Daniel Chounard and Christopher J. Cacciacarne are the principal actors in the vignettes.

The film had its sneak preview at the 2013 Tacoma Film Festival October 9, 2013 and its world premiere at the Arclight Documentary Festival October 11, 2013. The film was acquired by Gravitas Ventures February 2014 and released in the North American market June 3, 2014. Sideways Film acquire international rights to groundbreaking doc "DSKNECTD" and a 42-minute version of the film had its international television premier October 24, 2014 on ZDFinfo in Germany.

== Reception ==
Several reviewers criticized aspects of the film, but felt that the film was "incredibly pertinent" and a good conversation starter. Nick Schager of The Village Voice criticized the documentary calling it "a film as clumsy as the spelling of its title." Martin Tsai of the Los Angeles Times strongly criticized the film.

== Accolades ==
Festival	Date of ceremony	Category	Recipient(s)	Result
3rd ArcLight Documentary Festival	October 13, 2013	Best Documentary Feature	Dominic H. White	Nominated
Rincón International Film Festival 2014	April 14, 2014	Best Documentary Feature Director's Choice	Dominic H. White	Won
