= UploadVR =

American media company

UVR Media, LLC
- Formerly: UploadVR, Inc. (2014–2017); Upload, Inc. (2017–2018)
- Type: Private
- Industry: Virtual reality, mass media
- Founded: 2014; 12 years ago in San Francisco, US
- Founders: Taylor Freeman; Will Mason; Nick St. Pierre
- Headquarters: Los Angeles, US
- Key people: Kyle Riesenbeck (operations manager)
- Number of employees: 17 (2017)

UVR Media, LLC (formerly UploadVR, Inc. and Upload, Inc.) is an American media company that operates UploadVR, a virtual reality-focused trade publication website.

The company was founded as UploadVR in 2014 by Taylor Freeman, Will Mason, and Nick St. Pierre as a coworking company based in San Francisco. It later expanded to organize events, provide business incubation, and operate the UploadVR website. After rebranding to Upload and relocating to Marina del Rey in 2017, the company was sued over alleged gender discrimination, sexual harassment, and wrongful termination. The lawsuit was settled in September 2017 and Upload subsequently hired chief operating officer Anne Ahola Ward, who instituted mandatory anti-harassment training before leaving the company in October that year. Lacking financing, Upload shut down its offices and coworking spaces in March 2018, while the UploadVR website remained operational under UVR Media, which was incorporated as a new entity.

== History ==
Upload was founded as UploadVR in 2014 by Taylor Freeman, William "Will" Mason, and Nicholas "Nick" St. Pierre in San Francisco. St. Pierre dropped out of the company in early 2016. while Freeman and Mason acted as chief executive officer and president, respectively. Later that year, Mason began writing about virtual reality via the company's website. Initial contributors for this trade publication included Ryan Damm, Matthew Terndrup, Tony Davidson, and Ian Hamilton.

In December 2015, the company received US$1.25 million in seed funding from Shanda. In January 2016, UploadVR announced the formation of Upload Collective, an incubation and coworking space. The collective grew to host over startups where multiple events were hosted every week. In 2016, Upload partnered with Udacity, Google, HTC and Unity to develop the VR Nanodegree. They then partnered with Make School to create the UploadVR Academy, a 10-week boot camp for advanced developers to learn how to build desktop and mobile VR games using Unity.

In September 2016, a Series A round of funding, led by Colopl, raised $4.5 million for UploadVR. Further investors included General Catalyst, NetEase, Sparkland Capital, Unity Ventures, CRCM, GREE, GC Tracker, Outpost Capital, David Chao, and Julia Popowitz. Private investor Joe Kraus also contributed $25,000. In early 2017, UploadVR rebranded as Upload, shifting the "UploadVR" branding to its media arm. Tal Blevins, the co-founder and former editor-in-chief of IGN, was hired in January 2017 to head the editorial part of this arm.

In January 2017, Upload opened further offices in the Marina Business Center in Marina del Rey, California. In the signing of the lease for 20,000 square feet (1,900 m^{2}) of office space, Upload was represented by Garrett Ellis and Carter Haslam of CBRE, with support by Jeff Pion and Shay Bolton, while Hankey Investment Company, the owner of the business center, was represented by Christopher Strickfaden of NGKF. The offices were expected to be opened up as a further coworking space and the company's new headquarters in April. By May 2017, Upload had 17 full-time employees and several contractors.

In 2017, Upload ceased plans to establish a venture fund named Upload Ventures, for which it had been raising $12 million. In May, one former female employee filed a lawsuit against the company, Freeman, and Mason. The case was settled in September that year. In June 2017, the company hired Jacquelyn Ford Morie to head up its education efforts, and appointed Anne Ahola Ward, the former chief executive officer of CircleClick, as chief operating officer. Ward instituted a mandatory anti-harassment training at the company, composed of a two-hour session led by an external consultant. Ward left her position by October, less than four months after her appointment. Oculus VR founder reportedly Palmer Luckey stepped in to continue funding Upload, infusing as much as $2.5 million to keep it afloat. By March 2018, Luckey had ceased financing the company and, because the company had failed to acquire further funding, Upload's offices and coworking spaces were shut down. The lease for the San Francisco offices had already been taken over, while all staff were let go from the Marina del Rey headquarters on March 15. The properties were ultimately transferred to Starfish and The Riveter, respectively. The UploadVR website was unaffected by this closure. It became operated by a new entity, UVR Media, LLC, which was incorporated in March 2018.

== Lawsuit ==
In May 2017, Elizabeth Scott, who had been the director of digital and social media at Upload between April 2016 and March 2017, filed a civil lawsuit against Upload, Freeman and Mason, alleging gender discrimination, sexual harassment, and wrongful termination. The suit claimed that the male employees of the organization, including the founders, had created a work environment hostile against female employees, and openly discussed their sexual arousal with the affected personnel. It also stated that Upload had established a dedicated room, dubbed the "kink room", to encourage sexual intercourse at the workplace. When contacted by media outlets, Upload stated that the claims were "entirely without merit". The lawsuit was settled in September 2017 for a "modest sum". The lawsuit and its aftermath spawned a front-page article in The New York Times, prompting Freeman and Mason to release an open apology. At least six employees left Upload in solidarity with Scott.

== Accolades ==
Freeman and Mason were named in the media category of Forbes's "30 Under 30" list of successful young entrepreneurs in 2017.
