= Jacquelyn Ford Morie =

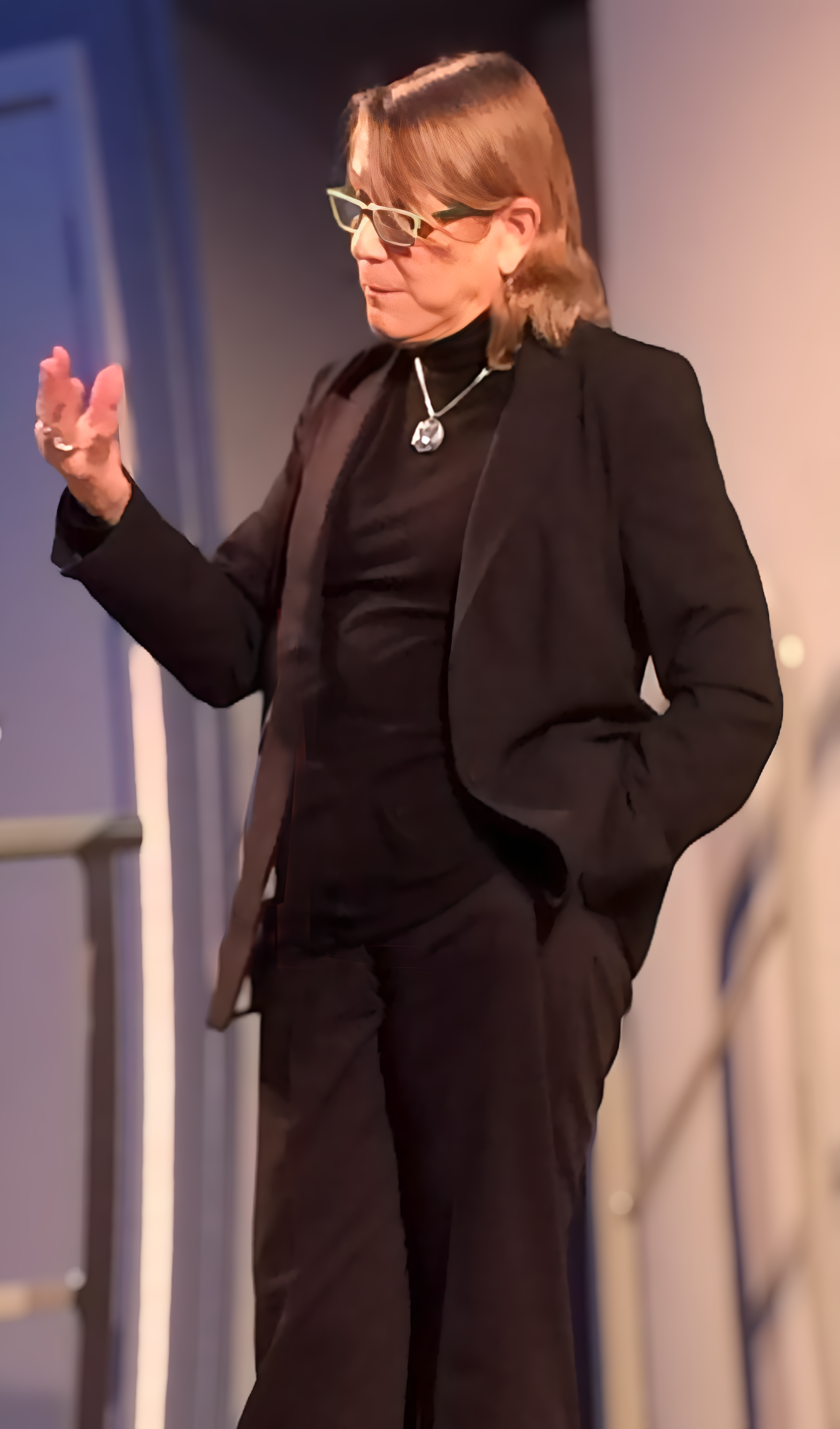
- Born: June 7 Frankfurt, Germany
- Education: University of East London (PhD); University of Florida; Florida Atlantic University
- Scientific career
- Fields: Virtual Reality
- Thesis: Meaning and emplacement in expressive immersive virtual environments (2007)

Jacquelyn Ford Morie is an artist, scientist and educator working in the areas of immersive worlds, virtual reality, games and social networks. Until 2013 she was a senior research scientist at the Institute for Creative Technologies. In 2011 she started a spin-off company called All These Worlds, to take her work in virtual worlds and avatars to a broader audience.

== Education ==
Morie was formally trained as an artist and medical illustrator but ultimately decided to pursue fine art. Her bachelor's degree in fine art was awarded cum laude by Florida Atlantic University in 1981. She next received a master's degree in fine art from the University of Florida in 1984, studying with noted photographer Jerry Uelsmann.

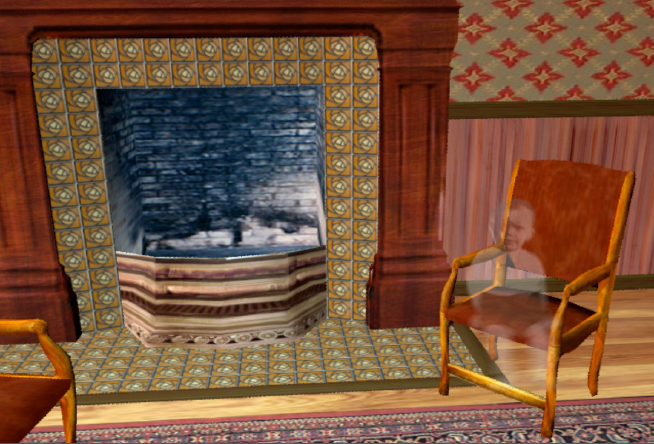
Scene from Forgotten Rooms experience of "MemoryStairs 2007"

She followed this degree with studies in computer graphics at the University of Florida, under Professor John Staudhammer, and received her master's degree in computer science from University of Florida in 1988. Morie received her PhD from SmartLab at the University of East London in 2008, with a practice based topic in meaningful, expressive virtual environments. Her immersive project for this degree work — "The Memory Stairs " — implemented a stair metaphor to provide participants experiences from before birth to near death.

== Career and research ==
In 1988, Morie was hired by the Ringling College of Art and Design to develop the Computer Graphic Design and Computer Animation programs. Seeking to create new forms of artwork in the emerging field of virtual reality, Morie subsequently accepted a researcher position at the Visual System Lab (VSL) at University of Central Florida in Orlando, FL. The VSL Lab, under the direction of J. Michael Moshell, was part of the Institute for Simulation and Training. During her time here (1990–1994) she worked on virtual reality projects for the State of Florida and the United States Army Research Laboratory.

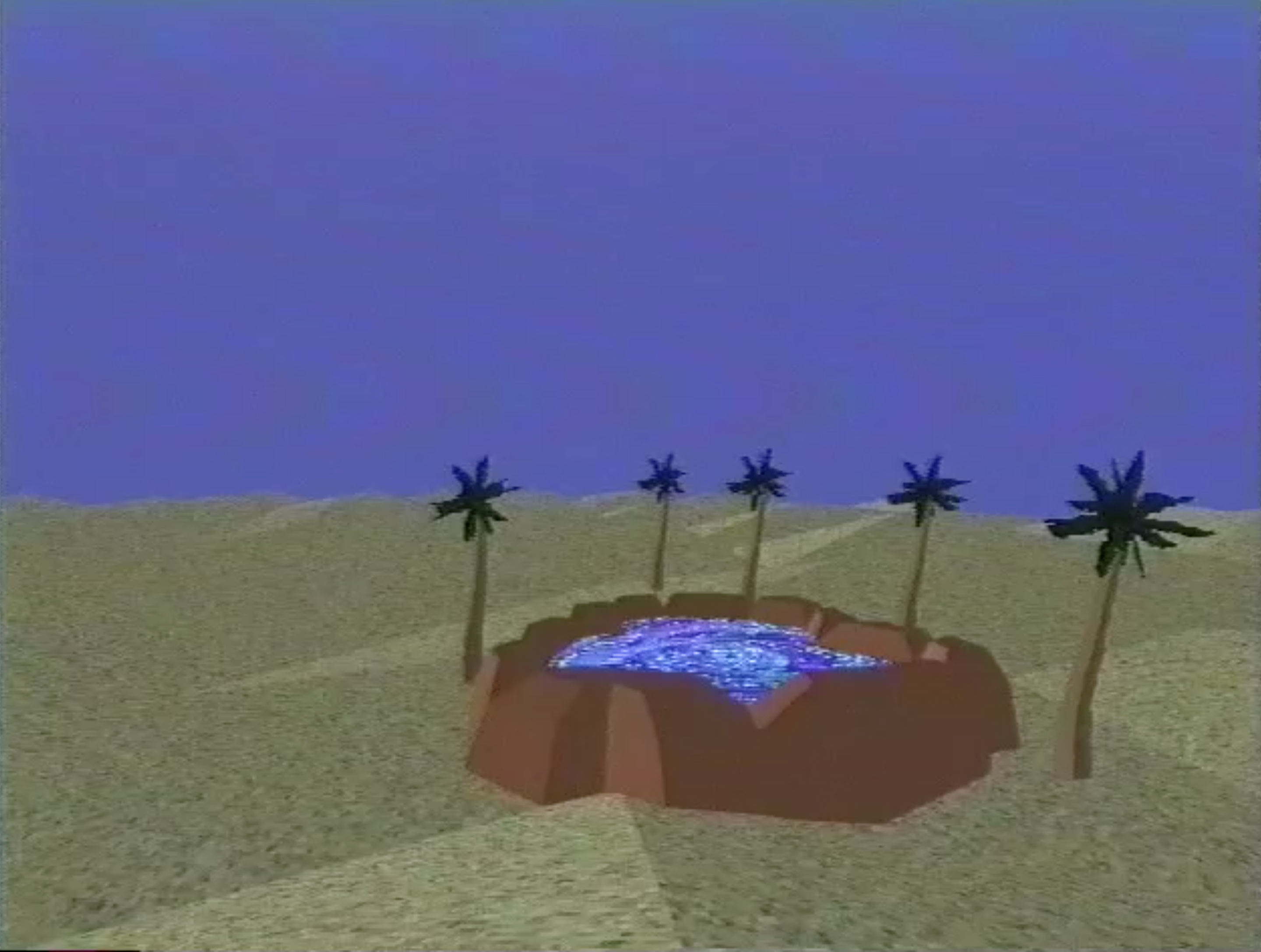
The desert interface for Morie and Goslin's "Virtopia" VR 1991

Together with fellow researcher Mike Goslin, Morie created a VR artwork entitled "Virtopia" debuting at the 1993 Florida Film Festival, making it the first VR Artwork to be premièred at such a venue. It was shown in a more mature form at the 1994 Florida Film Festival and at SIGGRAPH 1994's emerging tech venue, "The Edge".

From 1994 – 1997 Morie was head of Computer technical and artistic training for Walt Disney Feature Animation (WDFA) where she developed a comprehensive year-long apprenticeship for incoming computer graphic animators. She followed this with development of similar programs for the computer graphics effects industry, at VIFX, Blue Sky Studios and Rhythm and Hues Studios.

While working at WDFA, Morie was invited to take part in a 1996 National Research Council workshop entitled Modeling and Simulation: Linking Entertainment and Defense, held at the Beckman Laser Institute in Irvine, CA. This workshop was documented in a National Research Council publication of the same name.

The workshop led to the eventual formation of the Institute for Creative Technologies (ICT) at the University of Southern California in 1999. Along with Dr. Michael Zyda, Morie wrote the original pre-proposal for the new research center. In 2000, Morie joined the ICT full-time as a senior researcher in Virtual Worlds.

Her initial work at the ICT focused on the creation of meaningful, multisensory virtual environments. Two basic developments in this work included the design and use of an infrasonic floor to produce a subconscious "emotional score" for the virtual experience, and the invention of a scent collar that was patented in 2004.

Morie's later work at ICT is focused on extending virtual worlds into the health domain. Her project, Coming Home at the ICT developed several techniques that provide relaxation and stress relief for veterans of recent American conflicts. Part of this work resulted in porting ICT's Virtual Human technologies to the virtual worlds Active Worlds, OpenSim and Second Life. This work has been featured in two 2013 documentaries: Dsknectd: We Need to Talk by Internegative Films, and The Mindfulness Movie.

In 2016, Morie's company "All These Worlds" performed a notable project for NASA, titled "ANSIBLE: A Network of Social Interactions for Bilateral Life Enhancement". This project provided a bespoke series of virtual worlds to a test group of six scientists who were sequestered in a Mars habitat in Hawaii for a full year with no real time communication to the outside world. This work was featured in Ido Mizrahy's film "The Longest Goodbye" which premiered at Sundance 2023 and features an in-depth interview with Morie.

== Academia ==
Throughout her career Morie has taught and developed curricula for classes in Computer Graphics, Computer Animation, Virtual Reality, Narrative Design in the Metaverse, Game Design and more.

From 2016 through 2022 she taught VR Exploration classes at the Otis College of Art and Design. Since 2019 she has taught Immersive Experience Design classes through the UCLA Extensions studies program.

Additionally, she is teaching VR Production at Chapman University starting in 2025.

== Artistic career ==
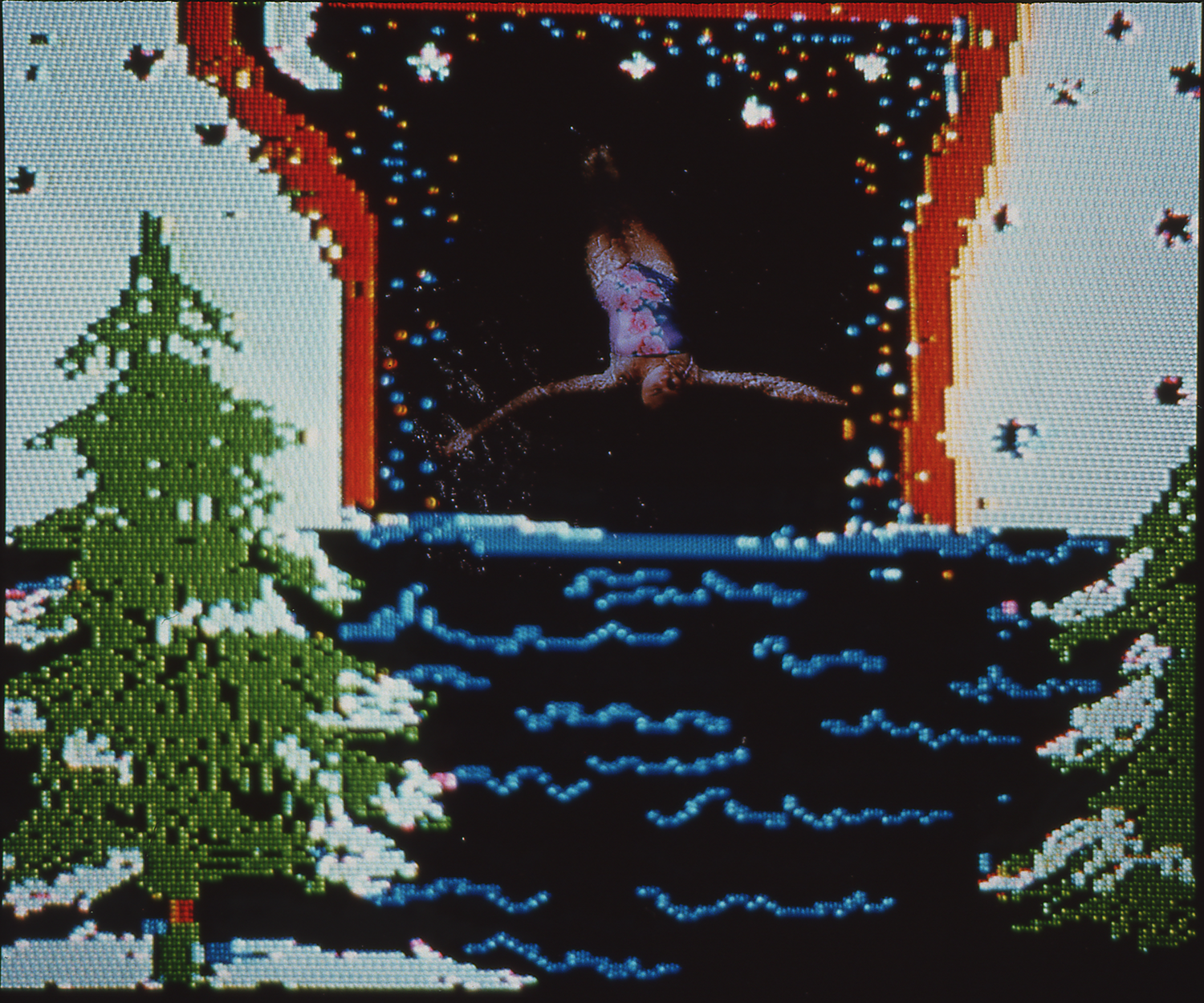
"Through The Portal" (1983)

Morie's art career began with her experimental fine art photography in the late 1970s through the 1980s. Her 1984 Fine Arts Masters' thesis introduced a remarkable new process for combining then nascent computer graphic images with traditional photographic imagery titled "Integrated Fantasies", these works were started in an Apple II computer and finished in a darkroom with multiple printing techniques.

She also created physical box assemblages during these years. When 3D computer graphics became available, she then created her assemblages as 3D models and presented them as stereo images. This was followed by her fully immersive VR art starting in 1990. Morie considers her VR experiences as an extension of the 3 dimensional boxes and stereo work she had created previously.

Some select shows of Morie’s artwork include:

- Artist In Residence Salon @ The Brewery Artwalk Spring
- When Pixels Were Precious Fall 2023 — A virtual reality autobiographical work. Official selection of the FIVARS Immersive Works Festival
- Memories of the Memory Stairs 2007 — Installation, Matrix Lab, London, University of East London, UK,
- The Memory Stairs March 2007 — Immersive VR work, Los Angeles SIGGRAPH Event, March 2007
- Goddesses Ex Machina October 2003 — Merlino Gallery, Cal State Long Beach
- River Visions June - July, 2000 — Arroyo Arts Collective Installation along the Los Angeles River, April 2000 Documentation Show at the LA River Center
- Gravity and Grace: Objects as Re-Collection — One-person show Oct - Nov. 1997 — Tah Gallery, Pasadena, CA
- Worlds within the Artist: 2D, 3D, and Realtime Computer Graphics, & Box Assemblages — One-person show Feb - Mar 1996 — Walt Disney Feature Animation Studios, Burbank, CA.
- Virtopia: Expressive Virtual Worlds June 1993 — Opening night premier Florida Film Festival at Orlando, Enzian Theater.
- SIGGRAPH 1989, 1988 and 1987 Art Shows — Association for Computing Machinery’s Special Interest Group on Computer Graphics,
- Four Photographers 1989 — Invitational, computer-manipulated images, Thomas Center Galleries, Gainesville, FL
- Ringling School of Art Faculty Art Show 1988 — Ringling Gallery, Sarasota, FL
- New American Photographs 1987 —Invitational, Fogg Art Museum, Cambridge, MA
- The Computer as Art 1986 — The Science Place, Southwest Museum of Science and Technology, Dallas, TX

== ACM SIGGRAPH ==
Morie began her work with the ACM Special Interest Group in Computer Graphics and Interactive Techniques (SIGGRAPH) in 1984. As part of the original SIGGRAPH Education Committee she authored a Taxonomy of Computer Graphics to help educators understand the relationships among the myriad computer graphics terms and processes.

She has often served as a jury member for the Emerging Tech and Computer Animation venues. In 1994 she served as Co-Chair of the Emerging Tech experience, The Edge, along with Christopher Stapleton. Her courses and panels at the ACM SIGGRAPH Conferences over the years include a wide variety of technology topics.

== Honors ==
In 2001 she was named one of the most creative people in America by Richard Saul Wurman in his publication: 1000: Who’s Really Who, Richard Saul Wurman’s 1000 Most Creative Individuals in the USA

In 2022 her immersive work "When Pixels Were Precious", which documents her earliest computer graphics art in a virtual reality setting, was a festival selection for the FIVARS Immersive Festival.

Morie received the Accenture Lifetime Achievement Award for her VR work at the 6th Annual AIXR global awards ceremony in Rotterdam on December 1, 2022.

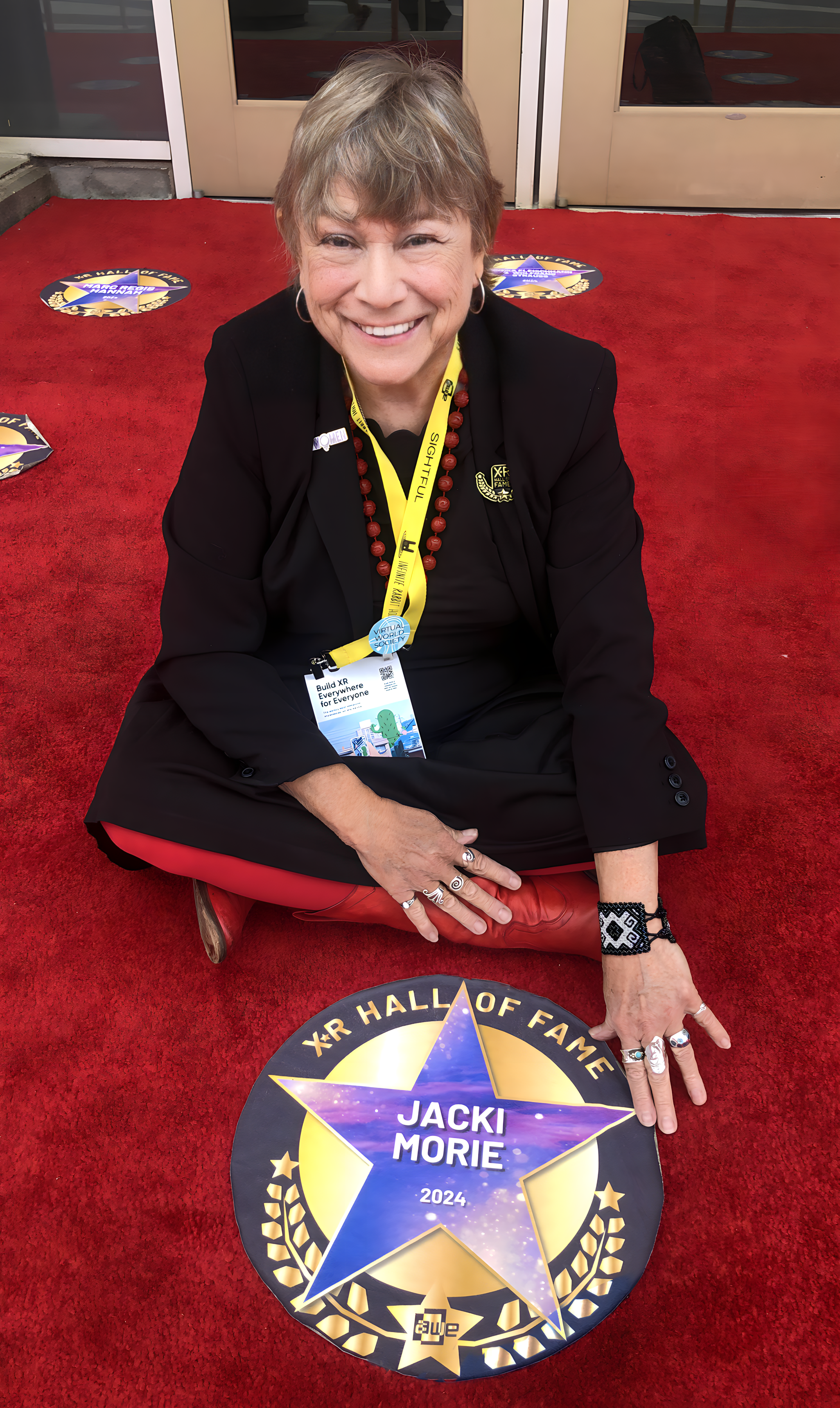
Jacki Morie - XR Hall Of Fame 2023

In June 2024, Morie was inducted into the XR Hall of Fame at the 11th 'Augmented World Expo Conference in Long Beach, California. She was also awarded the Virtual World Society’s Nextant Legacy Award at a special closing ceremony at the AWE Conference that year.

Also in 2024 she was inducted into the ACM SIGGRAPH Academy for pioneering contributions to the fusion of art with virtual reality and immersive technologies, and for advancing digital arts within the SIGGRAPH community

In December 2024, the Visual Effects Society (VES) announced that Morie would be the 2025 recipient of their Georges Méliès award.
