= Hampton Lintorn-Catlin =

American computer programmer (born 1982)

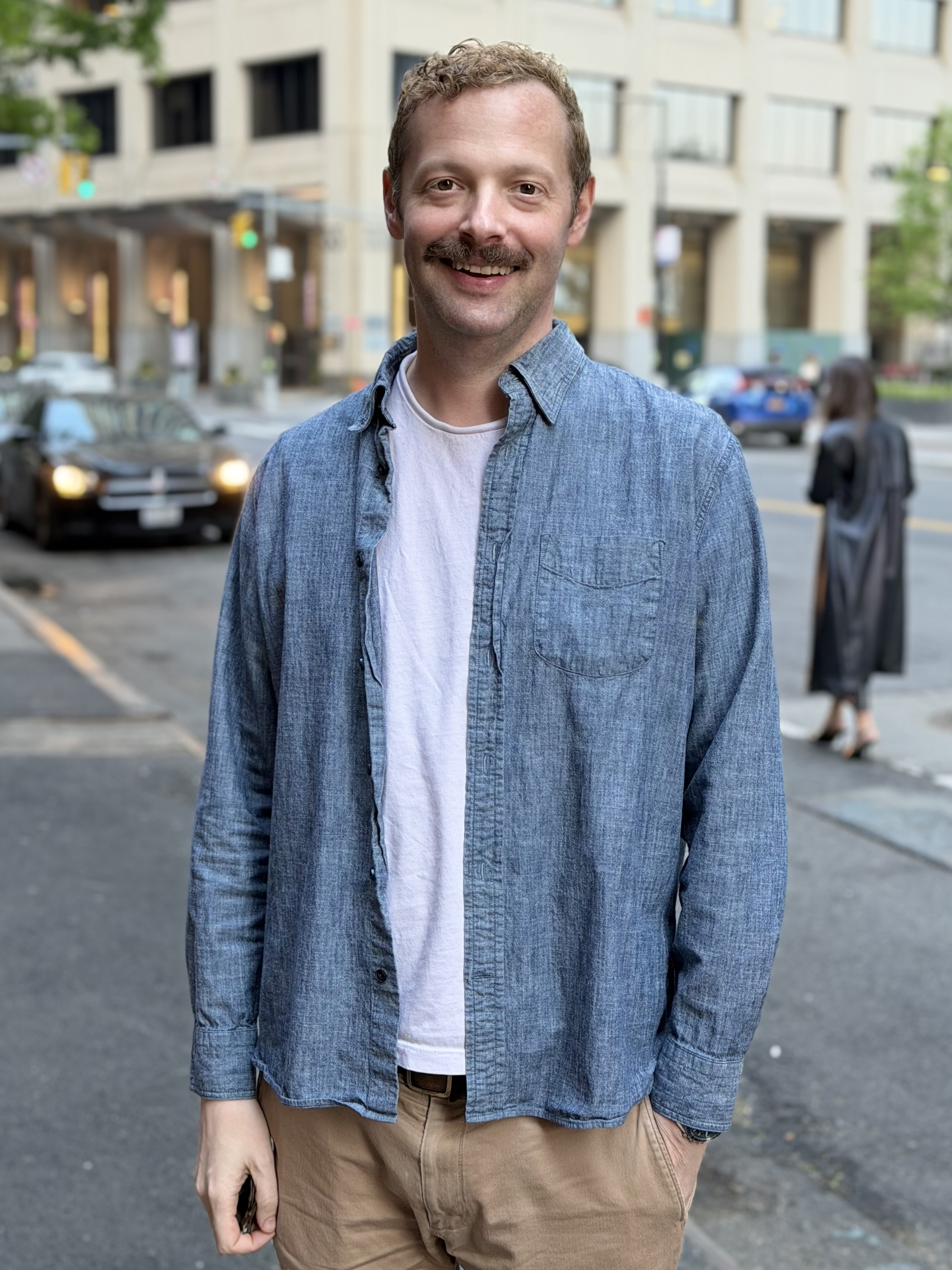
- Lintorn-Catlin in May 2026
- Born: Hampton Catlin; September 2, 1982 (age 44); Jacksonville, Florida, U.S.
- Occupations: Computer programmer; author
- Known for: Creating the Sass and Haml markup languages
- Partner: Michael Lintorn-Catlin

Hampton Lintorn-Catlin (né Catlin; born 1982) is an American computer programmer, programming language inventor, and author, best known as the creator of the Sass and Haml markup languages. He is a Principal Software Engineer at Square. He was previously CTO at Thriveworks, CTO at Moovweb (acquired by Limelight Networks in 2020), and Vice President of Engineering at Rent the Runway. He was Head of Mobile at the Wikimedia Foundation, where he led development of Wikipedia's mobile website and oversaw the foundation's mobile app efforts.

== Creations ==
=== Haml ===
He created a markup language called Haml which he intended to be a radically different design for inline page templating systems like eRuby in Ruby. Since its initial release in 2006, Haml has been ported to several other languages and has been the design inspiration for other languages like Slim. It is the second most popular templating language for the Ruby on Rails framework.

=== Sass ===
In 2006, Lintorn-Catlin created a style sheet language to expand on Cascading Style Sheets (CSS), used to describe presentation semantics of web pages. Lintorn-Catlin continued to work on Sass with co-designer Natalie Weizenbaum through 2008. Sass is now bundled as part of Rails.

In 2011, he co-wrote with his husband the book Pragmatic Guide to Sass, published through The Pragmatic Bookshelf.

=== Wikipedia Mobile ===
Lintorn-Catlin wrote several early applications for iOS and other mobile platforms, including Dictionary!, a popular dictionary application, and iWik (later renamed iPedia), an early third-party Wikipedia browsing client for the iPhone which the Wikimedia Foundation acquired in 2008. He was subsequently hired by Wikimedia as mobile development lead, launching the official mobile website in June 2009, with a backend developed in Ruby on the Merb framework.

== Personal life ==
Lintorn-Catlin was born on September 2, 1982, in Jacksonville, Florida, United States. He currently spends his time between New Orleans and New York with his husband and collaborator, Michael Lintorn-Catlin.

In March 2014, after Brendan Eich was appointed as new CEO of Mozilla, Lintorn-Catlin and his husband publicly withdrew their puzzle game from the Mozilla Marketplace in protest of Eich's earlier financial support for Proposition 8, a California ballot initiative that banned same-sex marriage, and called for a boycott of Mozilla. The couple's involvement was covered by the BBC, TechCrunch, and Vox, among others. Eich personally reached out to Lintorn-Catlin, and the two met in San Francisco in an attempt to find common ground. Eich resigned approximately a week after his appointment. In a follow-up post, Lintorn-Catlin called the outcome a "sad victory".

In March 2026, Lintorn-Catlin praised Block's 40% workforce reduction as the inevitable result of AI development while continuing to be employed there with his partner. Shortly after joining Block, the couple purchased a second home in New Orleans.

== See also ==
- List of inventors
- List of LGBT rights activists
- List of Wikipedia people
