= Why the lucky stiff =

Writer, artist and computer programmer

why the lucky stiff
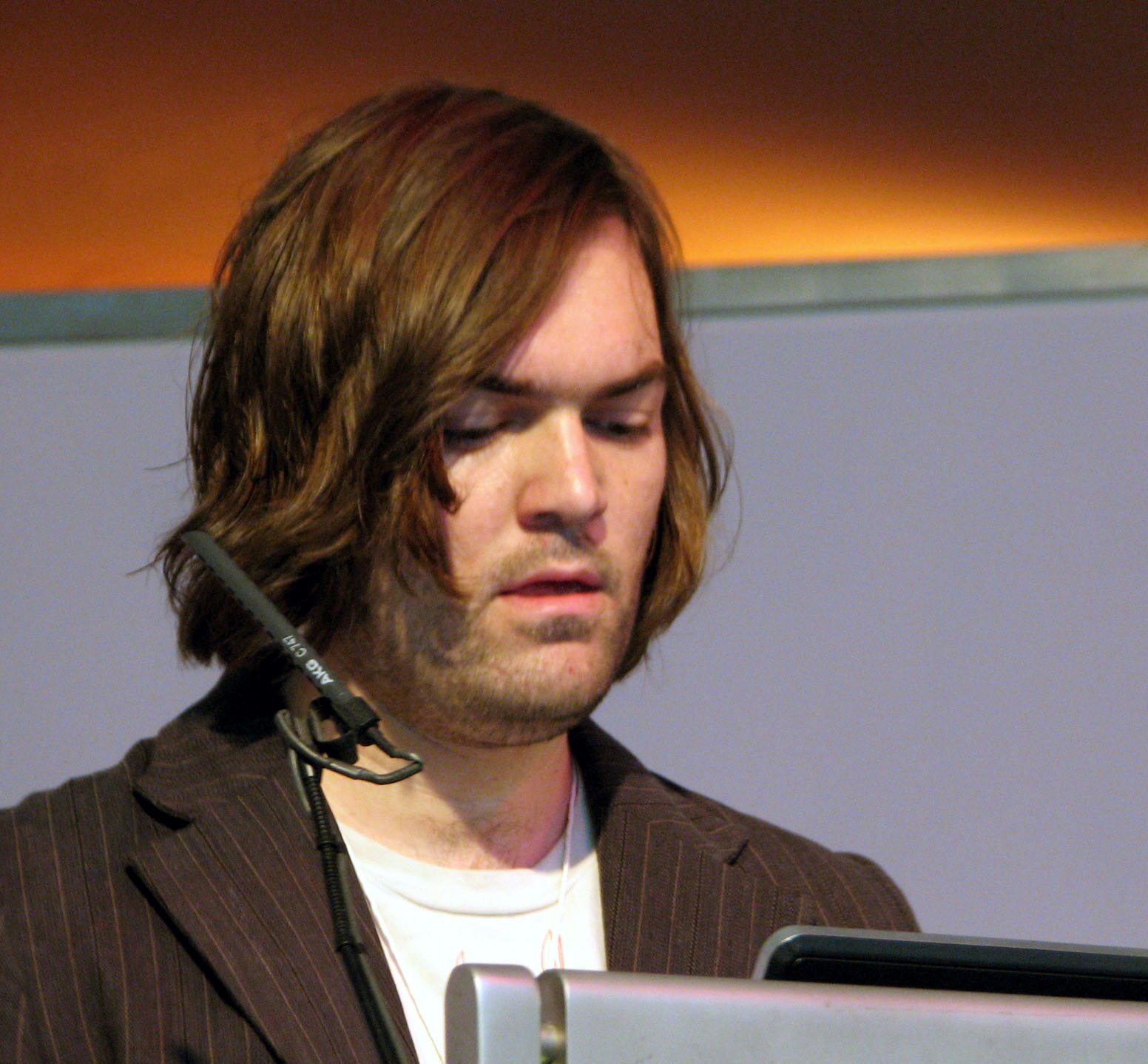
- _why at RailsConf Europe
- Born: Jonathan Gillette
- Other names: why, _why
- Occupations: Ruby programmer, author, musician
- Known for: Why's (poignant) Guide to Ruby, Camping

Jonathan Gillette, known by the pseudonym why the lucky stiff (often abbreviated as _why), is a writer, cartoonist, artist, and programmer notable for his work with the Ruby programming language. Annie Lowrey described him as "one of the most unusual, and beloved, computer programmers" in the world. Along with Yukihiro Matsumoto and David Heinemeier Hansson, he was seen as one of the key figures in the Ruby community. Lowrey has speculated that _why's pseudonym might be an allusion to the exclamation "Why, the lucky stiff!" from The Fountainhead.

_why made a presentation enigmatically titled "A Starry Afternoon, a Sinking Symphony, and the Polo Champ Who Gave It All Up for No Reason Whatsoever" at the 2005 O'Reilly Open Source Convention. It explored how to teach programming and make the subject more appealing to adolescents. _why gave a presentation and performed with his band, the Thirsty Cups, at RailsConf in 2006.

On 19 August 2009, _why's accounts on Twitter and GitHub and his personally maintained websites went offline. Shortly before he disappeared, _why tweeted, "programming is rather thankless. u see your works become replaced by superior ones in a year. unable to run at all in a few more."

_why's colleagues have assembled collections of his writings and projects.

In 2012, his website briefly went back online with a detailed explanation of his plans for the future.

== Works ==
=== Books ===
His best known work is Why's (poignant) Guide to Ruby, which "teaches Ruby with stories." Paul Adams of Webmonkey describes its eclectic style as resembling a "collaboration between Stan Lem and Ed Lear". Chapter three was published in The Best Software Writing I: Selected and Introduced by Joel Spolsky.

In April 2013, a complete book attributed to Jonathan Gillette was digitally released via the website whytheluckystiff.net (which has since changed ownership) and the GitHub repository cwales. It was presented as individual files of PCL (Printer Command Language) without any instructions on how to assemble the print-outs into a book. Based on timestamps from the git repository, Steve Klabnik compiled the pages in the order in which they were released into a PDF file which he titled CLOSURE since the book provides some resolution to the story. Although no authorship is claimed in either the book or the git repository, the writing style and content are very similar to those of Gillette, the storyline references certain events, and the text includes the names Jonathan Gillette and _why.

=== Code tutorials ===
Try Ruby is an online interactive learning tool that provided a browser-based Ruby shell and an instructor that guided beginners through their first steps in Ruby. Since _why's disappearance, the project has been continued in spirit at Try Ruby revision 4.

His final project before his internet retirement, Hackety Hack, is a Ruby- and Shoes-based environment intended to bring the power, freedom, and simplicity of BASIC programming to the current generation, with a particular focus on being accessible to children.

=== Code ===
_why is the author of several libraries and applications, most of them written in or for Ruby.

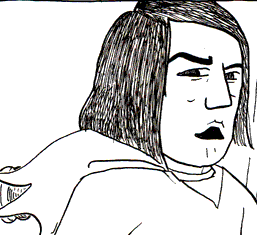
_why's self-portrait from Why's (poignant) Guide to Ruby

- Camping, a microframework inspired by Ruby on Rails and based on Markaby that is less than 4 kilobytes.
- Park Place, a "nearly complete clone of the Amazon S3 web service."
- Hobix, a YAML-based weblog application written in Ruby.
- Hpricot, an HTML parser
- Markaby (markup as Ruby), a DSL to generate valid HTML using Ruby blocks and methods instead of tags.
- MouseHole, a personal web proxy that can rewrite the web à la Greasemonkey
- the RedCloth library, which implements the Textile markup language
- the Sandbox, a library for managing several Ruby environments in a single process
- Syck, a YAML library for C, Ruby, and several other languages. Syck has been a part of standard Ruby libraries since Ruby version 1.8.0.
- Shoes, a UI toolkit "for Making Web-like Desktop Apps"
- unHoly, a Ruby bytecode to Python bytecode converter, for running Ruby applications on the Google Application Engine
- potion, a tiny, fast programming language with a JIT compiler, closure support and an object model built around mixins
- bloopsaphone, a crossplatform chiptune-like synth, based on PortAudio with a Ruby frontend

=== Art ===
He has illustrated The Ruby Programming Language, authored by David Flanagan and Yukihiro Matsumoto. He also dedicates his illustration every year to RubyKaigi, the biggest Ruby conference in Japan, similar to RubyConf.

In March 2009, he was a speaker at the Art and Code conference at Carnegie Mellon University.

== Real identity ==
_why never publicly revealed his own identity while he was active as "why the lucky stiff". Shortly before he left the public eye, an anonymous blog was posted, identifying him as Jonathan Gillette, and offering detailed information about his identity, including his schooling, his address, his membership in the band The Child Who Was a Keyhole, and the identity of his spouse. At the time, he did not make any statement on his being outed.

While his offline identity was considered common knowledge in the Ruby coding community, it remained unconfirmed until a 2012 article in Slate magazine quoted a statement from a fellow programmer saying, "Jonathan is _why, he is fine, and he just wants to be left alone."
