= Tailwind CSS =

Web design front-end framework

- Original authors: Adam Wathan, Jonathan Reinink, David Hemphill, and Steve Schoger
- Developer: Tailwind Labs
- Release: 13 May 2019; 7 years ago
- Stable release: 4.3.2 / 29 June 2026
- Written in: TypeScript, Rust, CSS
- Platform: Web
- Available in: English
- License: MIT License
- Website: tailwindcss.com
- Repository: github.com/tailwindlabs/tailwindcss

Tailwind CSS is an open-source CSS framework. Unlike other frameworks, like Bootstrap, it does not provide a series of predefined classes for elements such as buttons or tables. Instead, it creates a list of "utility" CSS classes that can be used to style each element by mixing and matching.

For example, in other traditional systems, there would be a class message-warning that would apply a yellow background color and bold text. To achieve this result in Tailwind, one would have to apply a set of classes created by the library: bg-yellow-300 and font-bold.

As of 23 June 2026, Tailwind CSS has over 95,700 stars on GitHub.

== Features ==
=== Utility classes ===
The utility-first concept refers to the main differentiating feature of Tailwind. Instead of creating classes around components (button, panel, menu, textbox ...), classes are built around a specific style element (yellow color, bold font, very large text, center element...). Each of these classes is called a utility class.

There are many utility classes in Tailwind CSS that enable control over a large number of CSS properties, such as color, borders, display type (display), font, font size, layout, and shadow.

Example: yellow notice
Result		
Code	<div class="m-4 p-4 bg-yellow-200 font-bold rounded-lg">   <p>Please be careful when feeding the birds.</p> </div>	
Classes	Tailwind	CSS equivalent
Classes	m-4	margin: 1rem;
Classes	p-4	padding: 1rem;
Classes	bg-yellow-200	background-color: rgb(254 240 138);
Classes	font-bold	font-weight: 700;
Classes	rounded-lg	border-radius: 0.5rem;

=== Variants ===
Tailwind offers the possibility to apply a utility class only in some situations through media queries, which is called a variant. The main use of variants is to design a responsive interface for various screen sizes. There are also variants for the different states an element can have, such as hover: for when hovered, focus: when keyboard selected or active: when in use, or when the browser or operating system has dark mode enabled.

Variants have two parts: the condition to be met and the class that is applied if the condition is met. For example, the variant md:bg-yellow-400 will apply the class bg-yellow-400 if the screen size is at least the value defined for md.

Tailwind CSS is developed using JavaScript, runs via Node.js, and installs with environment package managers like npm or yarn.

=== Settings and themes ===
It is possible to configure the utility classes and variants that Tailwind offers through a configuration file usually named tailwind.config.js. In the configuration, one can set the values of the utility classes, such as the color-palette or the sizes between elements for margins.

==== Build all and purge ====
The default mode of Tailwind is that the system generates all possible CSS combinations based on the project settings. Then, by means of another utility such as PurgeCSS, all the files are traversed, and the classes that are not being used are removed from the resulting CSS file.

Due to the number of classes that can be generated by the number of variants and their combinations, this method has the drawbacks of long waiting times and large sizes of CSS files before being purged. This mode of operation is no longer available in version 3 of Tailwind CSS.

==== Just-in-time mode ====
JIT mode (just-in-time) is an alternative way to generate the CSS that, instead of generating all possible classes and then removing all those that are not being used (tree shaking technique), parses the content of HTML, JSX, Vue files (or configured extensions or locations) and instantly generates only those classes that are needed and used.

By generating only the necessary CSS, JIT reduces the size of the CSS file. This technical improvement has made it possible to introduce numerous new variants and utility classes, as well as the ability to create utility classes on the fly with arbitrary values using square bracket notation (e.g., w-[137px], bg-[#1da1f2]) not set in the configuration.

Starting with version 3 of Tailwind CSS, JIT mode has become the default.

== Versions ==
Tailwind CSS uses semantic versioning to identify its version compatibility.

== See also ==
- jQuery Mobile
- JavaScript framework
- JavaScript library
