= CSS framework =

Library allowing for more standards-compliant web design

A CSS framework is a software library allowing for easier, more standards-compliant web design using Cascading Style Sheets. Most of these frameworks contain at least a grid. More functional frameworks also come with more features and additional JavaScript based functions, but are mostly design oriented and focused around interactive UI patterns. This detail differentiates CSS frameworks from other JavaScript frameworks.

Two notable and widely used examples are Bootstrap and Foundation.

Modules and tools offered by CSS frameworks include:

- reset style sheet
- grid, especially for responsive web design
- web typography
- set of icons in sprites or icon fonts
- styling for tooltips, buttons, elements of forms
- parts of graphical user interfaces such as accordion, tabs, slideshow or modal windows (Lightbox)
- equalizer to create equal height content
- often-used CSS helper classes (left, hide)

Bigger frameworks use a CSS interpreter such as Less or Sass.

== List of notable CSS frameworks ==
Name	Latest release		License	Grid	Units	Features	No. of columns
Name	version	date	License	Grid	Units	Features	No. of columns
Blueprint	1.0.1	May 14, 2011	MIT License	Typography, forms, print, plugins for buttons, tabs, and sprites.			
Bootstrap	5.3.8	August 26, 2025	MIT License (Apache License prior to 3.1.0)	fixed, fluid, responsive	px, %	Layout, typography, forms, buttons, navigation, media queries, .sass files, JavaScript libraries, RTL layout.	Any, default 12
Bulma	1.0.4	April 19, 2025	MIT License	flexbox, CSS grid, responsive	rem, px, %, CSS variables	Layout, typography, forms, buttons, navigation, responsive columns, CSS grid	Any
Foundation	6.9.0	September 28, 2024	MIT License	fluid	px, %	Responsive layout, source ordering, typography, forms, buttons, navigation, media queries, and JavaScript libraries.	Any, default 12
UI Kit	3.25.21	August 7, 2026	MIT License	flexbox, responsive	px, %, vw, rem	Layout, grids, typography, forms, buttons, navigation, cards, modals, animations, responsive utils, components	Any
YAML	4.1.2	July 28, 2013	CC-BY 2.0	fixed, elastic, fluid	px, em, %	Layout, grids, columns, forms, buttons, progressive linearization for responsive layouts, float handling, navigation, typography, accessibility, and add-ons. (accessible tabs, RTL-support, and microformats)	Any
YUI CSS grids	3.18.1	October 22, 2014	BSD-3	fixed and fluid			
Tailwind	4.3.0	May 09, 2026	MIT License	fixed, fluid, responsive			Any
