= Tritium (disambiguation) =

Tritium is a radioactive isotope of hydrogen.

Tritium may also refer to:

- Tritium Calcio 1908, an Italian association football club
- Tritium (programming language), a scripting language for transforming markup files
- Tritium (village), a Roman village in present-day Spain
- Tritium (company), an Australian electric vehicle charging station manufacturer
