= Adaptive design =

This is a disambiguation page:

- Adaptive design (medicine)
- Adaptive web design
