= Merb (disambiguation) =

Merb is a model-view framework for the Ruby programming language.

Merb, MERB, or variant may also refer to:

- MER-B, the Opportunity Mars rover
- Merbs, a fictional race from Storm Hawks, see List of Storm Hawks characters
- MerB, a bacterial gene that encodes Mercury(II) reductase
