= Markaby =

- Website: markaby.github.io/markaby/
- Repository: github.com/Markaby/Markaby

Markaby is a small Ruby library for writing HTML code in pure Ruby. It is an alternative to templating languages such as ERb and HAML which combine Ruby code with some form of markup. It was developed by the computer programmer "why the lucky stiff" and its name comes from Markup as Ruby.

== Usage ==
require 'markaby'

mab = Markaby::Builder.new
mab.html do
  head { title "Boats.com" }
  body do
    h1 "Boats.com has great deals"
    ul do
      li "$49 for a canoe"
      li "$39 for a raft"
      li "$29 for a huge boot that floats and can fit 5 people"
    end
  end
end
puts mab.to_s

Executing the above code will render the following HTML:

<html>
  <head>
    <meta content="text/html; charset=utf-8" http-equiv="Content-Type"/>
    <title>
    Boats.com</title>
  </head>
  <body>
    <h1>
    Boats.com has great deals</h1>
    <ul>
      <li>
      $49 for a canoe</li>
      <li>
      $39 for a raft</li>
      <li>
      $29 for a huge boot that floats and can fit 5 people</li>
    </ul>
  </body>
</html>

== Distribution ==
Gem

gem install markaby

Rails plugin

script/plugin install git://github.com/markaby/markaby.git

== Camping ==
Markaby is the templating engine used for the Camping micro web framework.

 module HomePage::Views

   # If you have a `layout' method like this, it
   # will wrap the HTML in the other methods.  The
   # `self << yield' is where the HTML is inserted.
   def layout
     html do
       title { 'My HomePage' }
       body { self << yield }
     end
   end

   # The `index' view.  Inside your views, you express
   # the HTML in Ruby.  See http://code.whytheluckystiff.net/markaby/.
   def index
     p 'Hi my name is Charles.'
     p 'Here are some links:'
     ul do
      li { a 'Google', :href => 'http://google.com/' }
      li { a 'A sample page', :href => '/sample' }
     end
   end

   # The `sample' view.
   def sample
     p 'A sample page'
   end
 end

== See also ==
- eRuby
- Haml
