= Why's (poignant) Guide to Ruby =

Introductory book to the Ruby programming language

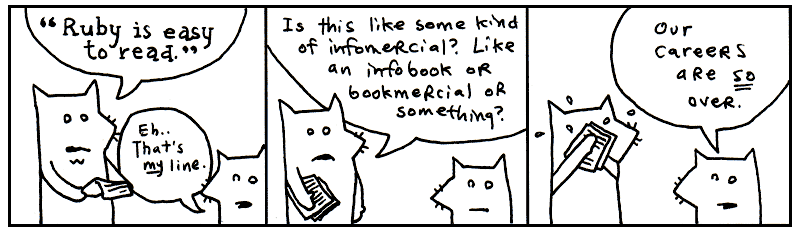
why's foxes

why's (poignant) Guide to Ruby, sometimes called w(p)GtR or just "the poignant guide", is an introductory book to the Ruby programming language, written by why the lucky stiff. The book is distributed under the Creative Commons Attribution-ShareAlike license.

The book is unusual among programming books in that it includes much strange humor and many narrative side tracks which are sometimes completely unrelated to the topic. Many motifs have become inside jokes in the Ruby community, such as references to the words "chunky bacon". The book includes many characters which have become popular as well, particularly the cartoon foxes and Trady Blix, a large black feline friend of why's, who acts as a guide to the foxes (and occasionally teaches them some Ruby).

The book is published in HTML and PDF. Chapter three was reprinted in The Best Software Writing I: Selected and Introduced by Joel Spolsky (Apress, 2005).

== Contents ==
1. About this book
2. Kon'nichi wa, Ruby
3. A Quick (and Hopefully Painless) Ride Through Ruby (with Cartoon Foxes): basic introduction to central Ruby concepts
4. Floating Little Leaves of Code: evaluation and values, hashes and lists
5. Them What Make the Rules and Them What Live the Dream: case/when, while/until, variable scope, blocks, methods, class definitions, class attributes, objects, modules, introspection in IRB, dup, self, rbconfig module
6. Downtown: metaprogramming, regular expressions
7. When You Wish Upon a Beard: send method, new methods in existing classes

The following chapters are "Expansion Packs":

1. The Tiger's Vest (with a Basic Introduction to IRB): discusses IRB, the interactive Ruby interpreter.
