= Stylus (style sheet language) =

Stylesheet preprocessor language

- Designed by: TJ Holowaychuk
- Developer: LearnBoost (March 29, 2011 - March 26, 2015) / Automattic (March 26, 2015 - Present)
- First appeared: 2010; 16 years ago
- Stable release: 0.63.0 / March 5, 2024; 2 years ago
- Typing discipline: Dynamic
- OS: Cross-platform
- License: MIT License
- Filename extensions: .styl
- Website: stylus-lang.com (Github)

Influenced by
- CSS, Sass, Less

Stylus is a dynamic stylesheet preprocessor language that is compiled into Cascading Style Sheets (CSS). Its design is influenced by Sass and Less. As of 2012, it was regarded as the fourth most used CSS preprocessor syntax. It was created by TJ Holowaychuk, a former programmer for Node.js and the creator of the Luna language. It is written in JADE and Node.js.

== Selectors ==
Unlike CSS, which uses braces to open and close declaration blocks, indentation can be used. Additionally, semi-colons (;) are optionally omitted. Hence, the following CSS:

body {
    color: white;
}

can be shortened to:

body 
    color: white

Further, colons (:) and commas (,) are also optional; that means the above can be written as,

body 
    color white

== Variables ==
Stylus allows variables to be defined, however unlike Less and Sass, it doesn't use a symbol to define variables. Additionally, variable assignment is done automatically by separating the property and keyword(s). In this way, variables are similar to the variables in Python.

message = 'Hello, World!'

div::before
  content message
  color #ffffff

The Stylus compiler would translate the above document to:

div::before {
  content: 'Hello, World!';
  color: #ffffff;
}

== Mixins and functions ==
Both mixins and functions are defined in the same manner, but they are applied in different ways.

For example, if you wanted to define the CSS border radius property without having to use various Vendor Prefixes you can create:

border-radius(n)
  -webkit-border-radius n
  -moz-border-radius n
  border-radius n

then, to include this as a mixin, you would reference it as:

div.rectangle 
  border-radius(10px)

this would compile to:

div.rectangle {
  -webkit-border-radius: 10px;
  -moz-border-radius: 10px;
  border-radius: 10px;
}

== Interpolation ==
To include variables in arguments and identifiers, brace characters surround the variable(s). For example,

 -webkit-{'border' + '-radius'}

evaluates to

-webkit-border-radius
