= Richard Kilmer =

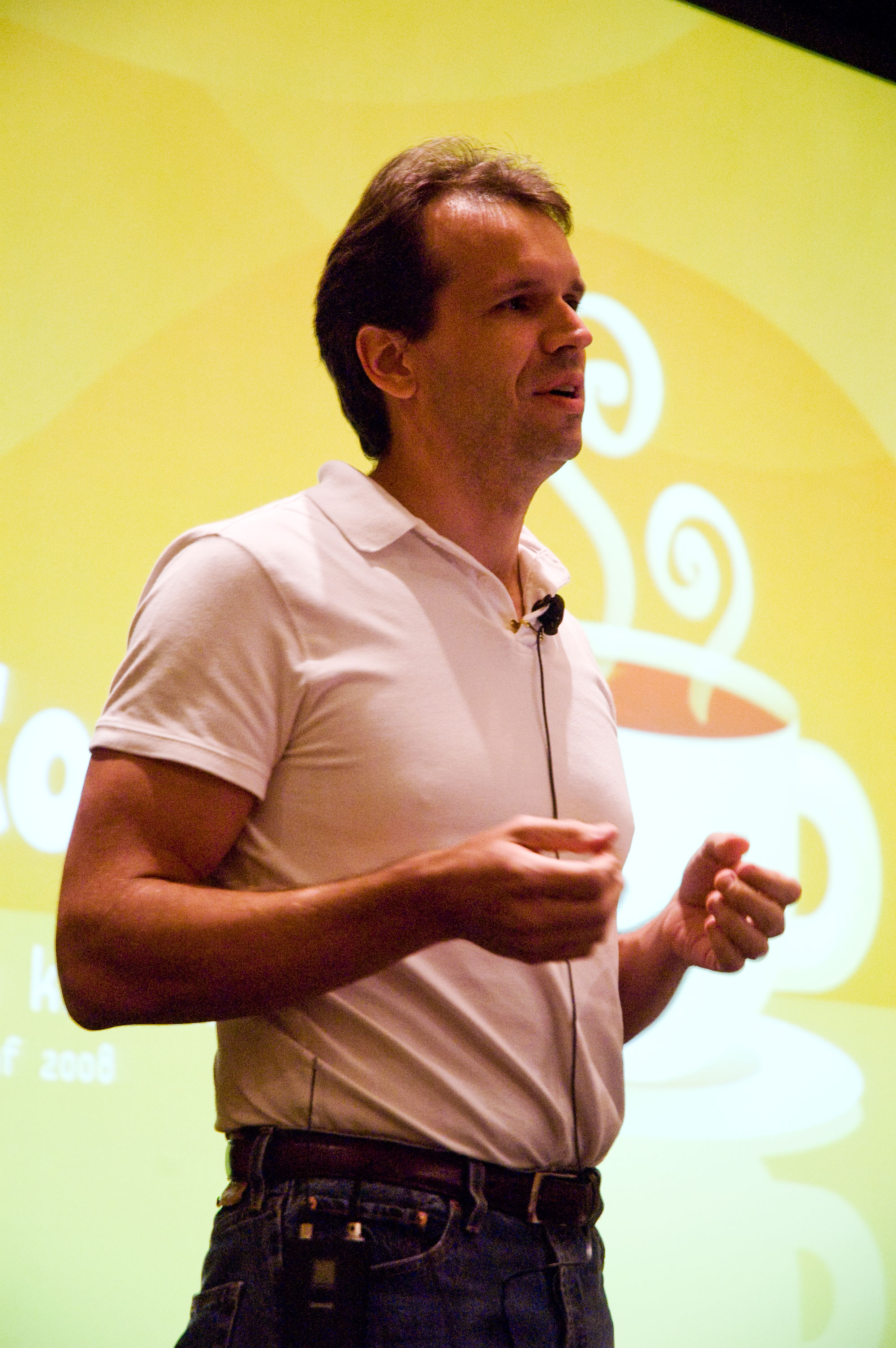
- Rich Kilmer presenting at the annual Ruby Conference
- Born: 1969 (age 56–57)
- Occupations: Technology entrepreneur Software programmer
- Known for: Creator of RubyGems; Co-founder of Ruby Central

Richard Kilmer (born Hemet, California, 1969) is a technology entrepreneur, software programmer and conference host and speaker in the open-source software community. He is an open-source contributor and developer of commercial software applications built in Ruby and Flash. His best known open-source software creation is of RubyGems, a package manager for the Ruby programming language most commonly used in downloads and deployments of the Ruby on Rails web application framework. He is currently the Co-Founder and CEO of CargoSense, Inc.

In 2001, he co-founded both the non-profit corporation Ruby Central, Inc. dedicated to the promotion of the Ruby programming language, and the for-profit corporation InfoEther, Inc., created to focus on applying the Ruby computer language in business. He served as president and CEO of InfoEther until its acquisition by LivingSocial in March 2011. At LivingSocial he was appointed a vice president working in roles in R&D, and led the software development of numerous projects in Merchant Services and mobile.

After several years at LivingSocial, he left in 2013 to form his current company, CargoSense, Inc., a Software-as-a-Service (SaaS) company aimed at bringing innovation to the logistics supply chain in numerous industries using sensor technology in the Internet of Things arena.

Prior to 2001, he was the co-founder and Chief Technology Officer for a leading-edge P2P software company where he was granted two U.S. patents and co-wrote a massive Java codebase.

Between 2002 and 2005 his for-profit company performed work for DARPA on both a massively multi-agent logistics software system and the Semantic Web project developing an early Ontological Web Language (OWL) library. Both projects drew on his expertise in computer security gained as a systems security manager while in the U.S. Air Force stationed at The Pentagon.

While he was an active board member in the non-profit Ruby Central, he played host to the annual international conferences put on by that organization for both Ruby and Ruby on Rails. By 2006, the Ruby on Rails conferences had become so large and popular that Ruby Central entered into an agreement with O'Reilly Media to co-promote Rails events in both the U.S. and Europe. Previously Rich had spoken at numerous O'Reilly Media open-source conferences. He has also been a consistent contributor at the Foo Camp events put on by O'Reilly Media and is a technology blogger.
