= Blueprint (CSS framework) =

CSS framework

- Final release: 1.0.1 / May 14, 2011; 15 years ago
- License: MIT License
- Website: www.blueprintcss.org
- Repository: github.com/joshuaclayton/blueprint-css

Blueprint is a discontinued CSS framework designed to reduce development time and ensure cross-browser compatibility when working with Cascading Style Sheets (CSS). It also serves as a foundation for many tools designed to make CSS development easier and more accessible to beginners.

== History ==
Blueprint was first created by Olav Bjørkøy and released on August 3, 2007. By August 11, Blueprint included work based on ideas from Jeff Croft, Nathan Borror, Christian Metts, and Eric A. Meyer. Version 0.8 was released on November 11, and included various bugfixes as well as a new "tabs" plugin. Blueprint's source repository was archived in April 2020.

== Purpose ==
One of the goals stated by the core team is to facilitate the development of new tools for working with CSS. A variety of CSS generators, visual editors, themes, and frameworks are based on Blueprint, many of which can be found on the Blueprint Wiki.

== License ==
Blueprint is released under a modified version of the MIT License, making it free software. It can be either used as is, or further adapted for use via a compression tool that is written in Ruby.

== Features ==
Blueprint's README file lists the following features as being provided out-of-the-box:

- A typographic baseline
- A stylesheet for printing
- An easily customizable grid
- Sensible default typography
- Perfected browser CSS reset
- Powerful scripts for customization
- Bloat Minimized as much as possible

== See also ==
- CSS box model
