= User interface plasticity =

Design concept

Plasticity is the capacity of a user interface to withstand variations of both the system's physical characteristics and the environment while preserving usability. A so-called "responsive web site" is an instance of a plastic user interface.
