= Scriptlet =

In JavaServer Pages (JSP) technology, a scriptlet is a piece of Java-code embedded in the HTML-like JSP code. The scriptlet is everything inside the <% %> tags. Between these the user can add any valid Scriptlet i.e. any valid Java Code.

In AppleScript, a scriptlet is a small script.

In Windows, a scriptlet is COM component including a HTML code and a script which may be written in a variety of scripting languages.

In the RPM package management system, a scriptlet is a script embedded in the SPEC file.
