= RubyKaigi =

Annual programming conference in Japan

RubyKaigi is an annual conference held in Japan for Ruby programmers that was held for the first time in 2006.

== Description ==
During RubyKaigi, there are presentations, discussions, and events about the Ruby programming language.

RubyKaigi was originally called the "Japanese Ruby Conference," but there was some confusion with Ruby Central, so it was named RubyKaigi.

At the end of RubyKaigi2010, staff reported that the final year of RubyKaigi would be 2011. However, Ruby no Kai resumed RubyKaigi in 2013 as "RubyKaigi" instead of Japanese "Ruby会議". They also decided to change its first language to be English instead of Japanese.
