= Ruby Central =

American non-profit organization

Ruby Central, Inc., is a non-profit organization based in the United States, dedicated to support and advocacy for the Ruby programming language.

Ruby Central is the parent organization of the annual International Ruby and Ruby on Rails Conferences, and serves as a visible presence and point of contact for corporate sponsors interested in supporting these conferences and other Ruby activities.

The organization was founded by a group of Ruby advocates including David Alan Black, Chad Fowler and Richard Kilmer. Black and Fowler were involved in organizing the first annual International Ruby Conference. Shortly after that conference, the organizers realized that a permanent organization was required to handle conference arrangements, and Ruby Central was created to address this.

Ruby Central's first project was RubyConf 2002, and annual RubyConfs have been held since then. Ruby Central produced the first official Ruby on Rails Conference, RailsConf 2006, in Chicago in June 2006. The organization partnered with the Bay Area-based SVForum to produce the 2006 Silicon Valley Ruby Conference, and with the UK training organization Skills Matter to produce the first official European Rails Conference in September 2006. In November 2007, Ruby Central presented RailsConf 2007 in Charlotte, North Carolina, in partnership with O'Reilly Media. The event was completely sold out by mid-October. RailsConf 2008, also presented in partnership with O'Reilly, was held 29 May – 1 June 2008 in Portland, Oregon.

Ruby Central has also become a hub for support of Ruby activities. The organization's first project other than RubyConf was the Ruby Codefest Grant Program, through which they offered support for local and regional groups of programmers working on Ruby library projects. In 2006 Ruby Central inaugurated a Regional Conference Grant Program, aimed at promoting smaller regional Ruby and Rails conferences.

== See also ==
- RubyKaigi, the largest Ruby conference in Japan
