= Merb =

Model-view framework for the Ruby programming language

Merb: No code is faster than no code
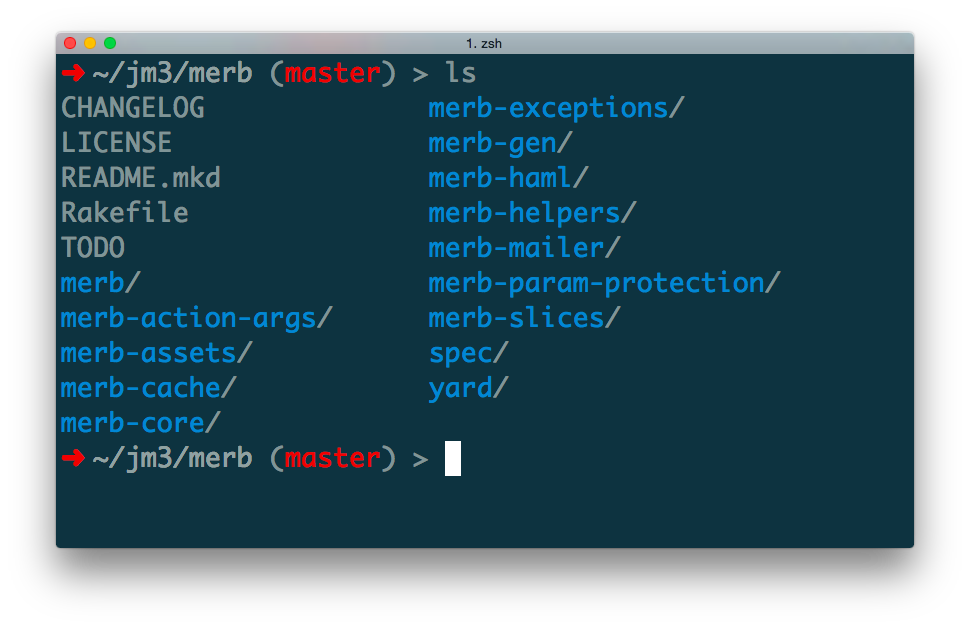
- All you need… nil you don’t
- Original author: Ezra Zygmuntowicz
- Developers: Ezra Zygmuntowicz & Yehuda Katz
- Final release: 1.1.3 / July 12, 2010
- Repository: github.com/merb/merb
- Written in: Ruby
- Operating system: Cross-platform
- Type: Web application framework
- License: MIT License
- Website: http://www.merbivore.com

Merb is a discontinued model–view–controller web framework in Ruby, notable as a precursor to Rails 3. It brought increased focus on speed and modularity to Rails 3. The name Merb is a contraction of "Mongrel" and "Erb".

== Precursor to and merge with Rails 3 ==
Merb began as a "clean-room" implementation of the Rails controller stack but grew to incorporate several ideas that deviated from Rails's spirit and methodology at the time, most notably component modularity, extensible API design, and vertical scalability. It was developed by Ezra Zygmuntowicz and Yehuda Katz. Most of these capabilities were added to Rails during the Rails 3/Merb merger. Merb was first released at the 2008 RubyConf and development has since stopped; Rails 3, therefore, serves as both the successor to Rails 2 and the successor to Merb.

== Differences from Ruby on Rails ==
Merb's design attempted to address several criticisms of Rails 2:

- lack of component modularity (monolithic design)
- lack of an extensible API
- lack of vertical scalability

=== Modularity ===
Merb itself encompassed only the controller layer in MVC architecture, and used a suite of complementary, optional plugins together to assemble applications. The primary integration points were the web server interface, the model layer, the view layer, and controller extensions and add-ons. Merb's default application stack incorporated Datamapper for models, ERB for views, and Rack and Mongrel as the web server layer.

=== Well-defined API ===
Before the Merb / Rails 3 merge, Rails lacked a well-defined, documented, public API for extensions and plug-ins, leading to issues when Rails changes broke monkey-patches performed by plug-ins. With the Rails 3 / Merb merge, Rails gained a defined public API with a test suite, giving users and plugin developers a clearer, more stable API to build against, reducing plugin breakage from release to release.

=== Performance and scalability ===
Some early versions of Rails received bad publicity for lack of performance, frequently due to developer confusion about ActiveRecord queries. David Heinemeier Hansson, the creator of Rails, stated that Merb re-wrote many core Rails pieces to be faster, and incorporated those changes from Merb in the Rails 3 merge, promising users that "Rails 3 will get all the performance attention that the Merb guys are known for".
