= Media queries =

Media queries is a feature of CSS 3 allowing content rendering to adapt to different conditions such as screen resolution (e.g. mobile and desktop screen size). It became a W3C recommended standard in June 2012, and is a cornerstone technology of responsive web design (RWD).

== History ==
Media queries were first sketched in Håkon Wium Lie's initial CSS proposal in 1994, but they did not become part of CSS 1. The HTML4 Recommendation from 1997 shows an example of how media queries could be added in the future. In 2000, W3C started work on media queries and also on another scheme for supporting various devices: CC/PP. The two address the same problem, but CC/PP is server-centric, while media queries are browser-centric. The first public working draft for media queries was published in 2001. Media Queries Level 3, published as a Candidate Recommendation on 27 July 2010, became a W3C Recommendation on 19 June 2012. Proposed corrections were published on 5 April 2022.

Media Queries Level 4, published as a Working Draft on 9 May 2017, were a W3C Candidate Recommendation Draft as of 25 December 2021.

== Usage ==
A media query consists of a media type and one or more expressions, involving media features, which resolve to either true or false. The result of the query is true if the media type specified in the media query matches the type of device the document is being displayed on and all expressions in the media query are true. When a media query is true, the corresponding style sheet or style rules are applied, following the normal cascading rules. Media queries use the @media CSS "at-rule".

== Examples ==
The following are examples of CSS media queries:

@media screen and (display-mode: fullscreen) {
  /* Code in here only applies to screens in fullscreen */
}

@media all and (orientation: landscape) {
  /* Code in here only applies in landscape orientation */
}

@media screen and (min-width: 500px) {
  /* Code in here only applies when screen width is 500 pixels or greater */
}

== Media types ==
A media type can be declared in the head of an HTML document using the "media" attribute inside of a <link> element. The value of the "media" attribute specifies on what device the linked document will be displayed. Media types can also be declared within XML processing instructions, the @import at-rule, and the @media at-rule. CSS 2 defines the following as media types:

- all (suitable for all devices)
- braille
- embossed
- handheld
- print
- projection
- screen
- speech
- tty
- TV

The media type "all" can also be used to indicate that a style sheet applies to all media types.

== Media features ==
The following table contains the media features listed in the latest W3C recommendation for media queries, dated 6 June 2007.

Feature	Value	Min/Max	Description
color	integer	Yes	Number of bits per color component
color-index	integer	Yes	Number of entries in the color lookup table
device-aspect-ratio	integer/integer	Yes	Aspect ratio
device-height	length	Yes	Height of the output device
device-width	length	Yes	Width of the output device
grid	integer	No	True for a grid-based device
height	length	Yes	Height of the rendering surface
monochrome	integer	Yes	Number of bits per pixel in a monochrome frame buffer
orientation	"portrait" or "landscape"	No	Orientation of the screen
resolution	resolution ("dpi", "dpcm" or "dppx")	Yes	Resolution
scan	"progressive" or "interlaced"	No	Scanning process of "tv" media types
width	length	Yes	Width of the rendering surface
