= Nesting (computing) =

Organization of information or objects into (usually self-similar) layers

In computing science and informatics, nesting is where information is organized in layers, or where objects contain other similar objects. It almost always refers to self-similar or recursive structures in some sense.

== Terminology ==
Nesting can mean:

- nested calls:
  - using several levels of subroutines
  - recursive calls
- nested levels of parentheses in arithmetic expressions
- nested blocks of imperative source code such as nested if-clauses, while-clauses, repeat-until clauses etc.
- information hiding:
  - nested function definitions with lexical scope
  - nested data structures such as records, objects, classes, etc.
- nested virtualization, also called recursive virtualization: running a virtual machine inside another virtual machine

== In spreadsheets ==
In a spreadsheet functions can be nested one into another, making complex formulas. The function wizard of the OpenOffice.org Calc application allows to navigate through multiple levels of nesting, letting the user to edit (and possibly correct) each one of them separately.

For example:

=IF(SUM(C8:G8)=0,"Y","N")

In this Microsoft Excel formula, the SUM function is nested inside the IF function. First, the formula calculates the sum of the numbers in the cells from C8 to G8. It then decides whether the sum is 0, and it displays the letter Y if the sum is 0, and the letter N if it is not.

Naturally, to allow the mathematical resolution of these chained (or better: nested) formulas, the inner expressions must be previously evaluated, and this outward direction is essential because the results that the internal functions return are temporarily used as entry data for the external ones.

Due to the potential accumulation of parentheses in only one code line, editing and error detecting (or debugging) can become somehow awkward. That is why modern programming environments -as well as spreadsheet programs- highlight in bold type the pair corresponding to the current editing position. The (automatic) balancing control of the opening and closing parenthesis is known as brace match checking.

With current Excel versions, LAMBDA functions can be used to create named custom functions in a formula and call the functions recursively.

== In programming ==
=== Control structures ===
In structured programming languages, nesting is related to the enclosing of control structures one into another, usually indicated through different indentation levels within the source code, as it is shown in this simple BASIC function:

function LookupCode(sCode as string) as integer
  dim iReturnValue as integer
  dim sLine, sPath as string  

  sPath="C:\Test.dsv"
  if FileExists(sPath) then
    open sPath for input as #1
    do while not EOF(1)
      line input #1, sLine
      if sCode=left(sLine, 3) then
        'Action(s) to be carried out
      End if
    loop
    close #1
  End if
  LookupCode=iReturnValue
end function

In this small and simple example, the conditional block “if... then... end if” is nested inside the “do while... loop” one.

Some languages such as Pascal and Ada have no restrictions on declarations depending on the nesting level, allowing precisely nested subprograms or even nested packages (Ada). Here is an example of both (simplified from a real case):

-- Getting rid of the global variables issue (cannot be used in parallel)
-- from a set of old sources, without the need to change that code's
-- logic or structure.
--
procedure Nesting_example_1 is

  type Buffer_type is array(Integer range <>) of Integer;

  procedure Decompress(
    compressed  :  in Buffer_type;
    decompressed: out Buffer_type
  )
  is
    -- Here are the legacy sources, translated:
    package X_Globals is
      index_in, index_out: Integer;
      -- *** ^ These variables are local to Decompress.
      -- ***   Now Decompress is task-safe.
    end X_Globals;
    -- Methods 1,2,3,... (specifications)
    package X_Method_1 is
      procedure Decompress_1;
    end X_Method_1;
    -- Methods 1,2,3,... (code)
    package body X_Method_1 is
      use X_Globals;
      procedure Decompress_1 is
      begin
        index_in:= compressed'First;
        -- Here, the decompression code, method 1
      end Decompress_1;
    end X_Method_1;
    -- End of the legacy sources
  begin
    X_Method_1.Decompress_1;
  end Decompress;

  test_in, test_out: Buffer_type(1..10_000);

begin
  Decompress(test_in, test_out);
end Nesting_example_1;

=== Data structures ===
Nested data structures are also commonly encountered in programming.

==== Lisp ====
In the functional programming languages, such as Lisp, a list data structure exists as does a simpler atom data structure.

- Simple lists hold only atoms.

( A T O M S )

The atoms in the list are A, T, O, M, and S.

- Nested lists hold both atoms and other lists.

( ( ( N E S T E D ) L I S T S ) ( C A N ) ( B E ) U N N E C E S S A R I L Y ( C O M P L E X ) )

== See also ==
- Flow control
- For loop
- Pseudocode
- Structured programming
