= Rake (software) =

Make-like tool written in Ruby

- Developer: Jim Weirich
- Stable release: 13.2.1 / April 5, 2024; 23 months ago
- Written in: Ruby
- Operating system: Cross-platform
- Type: Software development tools
- License: MIT License
- Website: ruby.github.io/rake/
- Repository: github.com/ruby/rake

Rake is a software task management and a build automation tool created by Jim Weirich. It allows the user to specify tasks and to describe dependencies as well as to group tasks into namespaces. It is similar to SCons and Make. Rake was written in Ruby and has been part of the standard library of Ruby since version 1.9.

== Examples ==
The tasks that should be executed need to be defined in a configuration file called Rakefile. A Rakefile has no special syntax and contains executable Ruby code.

=== Tasks ===
The basic unit in Rake is the task. A task has a name and an action block, that defines its functionality. The following code defines a task called greet that will output the text "Hello, Rake!" to the console.

task :greet do
    puts "Hello, Rake!"
end

When defining a task, you can optionally add dependencies, that is one task can depend on the successful completion of another task. Calling the "seed" task from the following example will first execute the "migrate" task and only then proceed with the execution of the "seed" task.

task :seed => :migrate do
    # This task will run after the :migrate task
end

Tasks can also be made more versatile by accepting arguments. For example, the "generate_report" task will take a date as argument. If no argument is supplied the current date is used.

task :generate_report, [:date] do |t, args|
    report_date = args[:date] || Date.today
    # Generate the report based on the specified date
end

A special type of task is the file task, which can be used to specify file creation tasks. The following task, for example, is given two object files, i.e. "a.o" and "b.o", to create an executable program.

file "prog" => ["a.o", "b.o"] do |t|
    sh "cc -o #{t.name} #{t.prerequisites.join(' ')}"
end

Another useful tool is the directory convenience method, that can be used to create directories upon demand.

directory "testdata/examples/doc"

=== Rules ===
When a file is named as a prerequisite but it does not have a file task defined for it, Rake will attempt to synthesize a task by looking at a list of rules supplied in the Rakefile. For example, suppose we were trying to invoke task "mycode.o" with no tasks defined for it. If the Rakefile has a rule that looks like this:

rule '.o' => '.c' do |t|
  sh "cc #{t.source} -c -o #{t.name}"
end

This rule will synthesize any task that ends in ".o". It has as a prerequisite that a source file with an extension of ".c" must exist. If Rake is able to find a file named "mycode.c", it will automatically create a task that builds "mycode.o" from "mycode.c". If the file "mycode.c" does not exist, Rake will attempt to recursively synthesize a rule for it.

When a task is synthesized from a rule, the source attribute of the task is set to the matching source file. This allows users to write rules with actions that reference the source file.

=== Advanced rules ===
Any regular expression may be used as the rule pattern. Additionally, a proc may be used to calculate the name of the source file. This allows for complex patterns and sources.

The following rule is equivalent to the example above:

rule(/\.o$/ =>
  ->(t_name){ t_name.sub /\.o$/, '.c' }) do |t|
  sh "cc #{t.source} -c -o #{t.name}"
end

NOTE: Because of a quirk in Ruby syntax, parentheses are required around a rule when the first argument is a regular expression.

The following rule might be used for Java files:

rule '.class' => ->(t_name){ t_name
    .sub(/\.class$/, '.java')
    .sub(/^classes\//, 'src/') } do |t|
  java_compile(t.source, t.name)
end

=== Namespaces ===
To better organize big Rakefiles, tasks can be grouped into namespaces. Below is an example of a simple Rake recipe:

namespace :cake do
  desc 'make pancakes'
  task :pancake => [:flour, :milk, :egg, :baking_powder] do
    puts "sizzle"
  end
  task :butter do
    puts "cut 3 tablespoons of butter into tiny squares"
  end
  task :flour => :butter do
    puts "use hands to knead butter squares into 1 1/2 cup flour"
  end
  task :milk do
    puts "add 1 1/4 cup milk"
  end
  task :egg do
    puts "add 1 egg"
  end
  task :baking_powder do
    puts "add 3 1/2 teaspoons baking powder"
  end
end

== See also ==
- Make
- Apache Maven
- Apache Ant
