= Layer0 =

American software company

- Industry: Platform as a Service, Serverless Computing, Cloud Computing
- Founded: 2009
- Founder: Ajay Kapur, Ishan Anand
- Headquarters: San Francisco, California, United States of America
- Products: Moovweb XDN, React Storefront
- Website: layer0.co

Layer0 (previously Moovweb), is an American software company based in San Francisco, California, providing infrastructure to run dynamic websites frontends.

The company was founded in 2009 by Ajay Kapur and Ishan Anand with $700,000 invested by Andy Bechtolsheim, and has since raised $16.7 million in venture funding. The company helped integrate Google Wallet into the 1-800-Flowers.com mobile site. Moovweb is a Google Wallet Premium Platform Partner. Moovweb has employed PayPal Express checkout on some of the sites it has developed.

Moovweb has rebranded itself as Layer0 in April 24, 2021. The company was acquired by Edgio in July 2021.
