= List of online educational resources =

This is a list of online education platforms such as open source, online university, and proprietary platforms.

== Free or open-source platforms and resources ==
- ABCya — educational games and activities for school-aged children
- Academic Earth – online university courses and lectures
- Alison – provides free online certificate and diploma courses aimed at skills development and lifelong learning
- Bookboon – online e-books and textbooks
- Boundless – online educational materials and textbooks
- Chatbots – ChatGPT, DeepSeek, Google Gemini, Microsoft Copilot, Perplexity AI.
- CK-12 Foundation – customizable digital textbooks and learning resources (FlexBook)
- CoCalc – freemium web-based platform for computational mathematics and computer programming
- Code.org – computer science education platform
- Codecademy – interactive computer programming courses
- CodeSandbox – web-based integrated development environment for computer programming
- Codewars – competitive programming challenges in an online IDE
- Comparison of online source code playgrounds – Replit, CodePen, JSFiddle, W3Schools
- Curriki – online open educational resources and curricula
- Desmos – graphing calculator
- diagrams.net – software for diagrams such as flowcharts, wireframes, UML, organizational charts, and network diagrams.
- Discourse – Internet forum for open-source software and online community projects for long-form discussion and learning.
- EarSketch – musical programming using Python and JavaScript as an audio programming language
- EasyEDA – web-based EDA and circuit simulation
- Eliademy – massive open online course platform
- Exercism – free coding practice and mentorship platform
- Firebase Studio – online integrated development environment (IDE) developed by Google
- FreeCodeCamp – computer programming courses and projects
- GeoGebra – interactive geometry, algebra, statistics and calculus web-app.
- GitHub Codespaces – online IDE for computer programming
- Google Colab – Jupyter notebook for Python programming, machine learning, data science, and educational technology.
- Google Scholar – search engine for scholarly literature
- H5P – framework for creating, sharing, and reusing interactive HTML5 content
- Hyperskill – online platform by JetBrains for computer programming in Python, Java, Kotlin, JavaScript, Go, C++, and SQL
- Internet Archive – digital library of books, media, and websites
- Jupyter Notebook – web-based interactive computational notebook environment
- Kaggle – data science competition platform, free courses and tutorials, and Jupyter Notebook
- KaTeX.org – web-based LaTeX equation editor
- Khan Academy – online courses and educational resources
- LibreTexts – online open educational resources and textbooks
- LeetCode – coding interview preparation and programming practice platform
- Markdown editors – CoCalc, TiddlyWiki, Gollum, and Wiki.js.
- MathOverflow – mathematics Q&A website
- MDN Web Docs – documentation repository and learning resource for web developers
- Medscape – medical information and educational resources
- MERLOT – online collection of open educational resources
- MIT App Inventor – high-level block-based visual programming language to create computer applications for Android and iOS
- MIT OpenCourseWare – free publication of course materials from the Massachusetts Institute of Technology
- Mozilla Developer Network – web development documentation and learning resources
- NCBI Bookshelf – online biomedical and health science books
- OER Commons – digital library of open educational resources
- Open access journals – freely accessible academic journals
- Open Course Library – openly licensed college course materials
- openHPI – MOOC in the field of computer science and information technology
- OpenLearn – online courses and educational resources
- openPlaG – web-app function graph plotter
- OpenStax – nonprofit publisher of free, openly licensed textbooks and educational resources
- PhET Interactive Simulations – interactive educational simulations for science and mathematics
- PhysicsOverflow – physics Q&A website
- Project Euler – mathematical and computer programming problems
- Project Gutenberg – digital library of public domain books
- Quizlet – freemium online flashcard and study platform
- SageMath – computer algebra system for computational mathematics
- Saylor Academy – online college-level courses
- Sci-Hub – platform that provides access to academic papers
- SketchUp Free – web-based 3D modeling software
- Stack Overflow – Q&A website for computer programmers
- SWAYAM – Indian massive open online course platform
- Tanagra (machine learning) – data mining software developed for research and teaching
- TeX editors – Authorea, CoCalc, and Overleaf
- Tinkercad – 3D modeling
- Tinkercad Circuits – electronic circuit simulator that supports Arduino Uno microcontrollers, Micro Bit (Micro:bit) boards, or ATtiny chips
- Upverter – web-based EDA and PCB design
- W3Schools – freemium educational website for learning computer programming online
- Wikibooks – collaborative online open-content textbooks
- WikiEducator – platform for developing open educational resources
- Wikipedia — free online encyclopedia
- Wikipedia Sandbox – sandbox to learn Wikitext and computational writing making tables, graphs, LaTeX, math and chemistry notation.
- Wikiversity – collaborative online educational resources and courses
- Wolfram MathWorld and WolframAlpha – online mathematics reference and computational tools
- YouTube EDU – educational videos and lectures

== University-based resources ==
- MIT OpenCourseWare
- National Programme on Technology Enhanced Learning
- OpenStax - Rice University open licensed textbooks
- Open.Michigan
- Open Universities Australia
- Open Yale Courses
- Stanford Online
- University of London Worldwide

== Proprietary platforms ==
- Art of Problem Solving
- Babbel – online language learning platform
- Brightstorm
- Brilliant
- Chegg – provides homework help, digital and physical textbook rentals, textbooks, online tutoring, and other student services.
- Coursera
- Coursmos
- Duolingo
- edX
- FutureLearn
- Grok – xAI chatbot
- Grovo
- iversity
- Kadenze
- Khanmigo – Khan Academy chatbot assistant
- LinkedIn Learning
- Lyryx Learning
- MasterClass
- Mathletics – math quizzes and challenges, and can participate in a real-time networked competition known as 'Live Mathletics'
- Microsoft Copilot chatbot
- Open University
- OpenClassrooms
- OpenLearning
- Pluralsight
- SageMath
- Shaw Academy
- SitePoint – website, and publisher of ebooks, courses and articles for web developers
- Skillshare
- Skillsoft
- Statistics Online Computational Resource (SOCR) – statistics and data science education
- Symbolab – computational mathematics
- The Teaching Company
- TinkerPlots – exploratory data analysis and modeling software designed for use by students in grades 4 through university
- Treehouse – web design, web development, mobile development and game development
- Tutor.com – online tutoring service
- Udacity
- Udemy
- Unacademy – online educational platform and exam-preparation service
- Vedantu – online tutoring platform
- Wyzant – online tutor marketplace

== See also ==
- Computer-based mathematics education
- Competitive programming online platforms
- Comparison of e-readers – Comparison of Android e-reader software and Comparison of iOS e-reader software
- Google Books, Apple Books, Kindle Store, Kobo Books, Nook, Scribd, Audible, Project Gutenberg, Internet Archive, Bookmate.
- List of learning management systems – Moodle, Blackboard Learn, Sakai, Google Classroom, and GitHub Classroom
- List of digital library projects
- List of educational software
- List of free educational software
- List of homeschooling software
- List of language self-study programs
- List of MOOC providers
- List of online learning communities
- List of open-source software for mathematics
- Lists of academic journals
- Lists of books
- Massive open online course
- Mathematical software
- National Repository of Open Educational Resources
- Open Educational Resource (OER) Universitas
- Online credentials for learning
- Online learning in higher education
- Online music education
- Open Education Resources
- Open learning Initiative
- OpenCourseWare
