= List of MOOC providers =

The following is a list of notable massive open online course providers (MOOCs) worldwide.

Name	Topics	Education level	Cost	Languages courses are available in	Provider/s	Type	Founded	Headquarters
Alison	IT, Language, Science, Health, Humanities, Software Development, Marketing, Business, Math, Lifestyle, Healthcare, Life sciences, Operations, Skilled trades, Finance		Freemium		Alison	Commercial	2007	Ireland
Canvas Network	languages & how to use Canvas	K12, Higher education	Free		Instructure, Inc	Commercial	2008	US
Coursera	Business & Management, IT, Languages, Creative Arts & Media, Healthcare, Medicine, History, Law, Literature, Nature, Environment, Politics, Society, Psychology, Science, Engineering, Maths, Studying, Teaching		Most courses free to audit, certificates different prices	English, Hindi, Spanish, French, Chinese, Arabic, Russian, Portuguese, Turkish, Ukrainian, Hebrew, German, Italian		Commercial	2012	US
edX	Business & Management, IT, Languages, Creative Arts & Media, Healthcare, Medicine, History, Law, Literature, Nature, Environment, Politics, Society, Psychology, Science, Engineering, Maths, Studying, Teaching		Most courses free to audit, certificates different prices	English, Spanish, French, Mandarin, Italian, Russian, Simplified Chinese, German, Portuguese, Japanese, Arabic, Dutch, Korean. Turkish, Tibetan, Chinese – Traditional, Hindi, Hungarian, Vietnamese		Commercial	2012	US
FUN	Digital life and technology, Education and training, Health, Environment and sustainable development, Physics and Chemistry, IT and programming, Political science and international relations, Law, Economy and management, Life Sciences		Free access to courses, free and paid certification	French, English, Spanish, Arabic, Chinese		Non-profit	2013	France
FutureLearn	Business & Management, IT, Languages, Creative Arts & Media, Healthcare, Medicine, History, Law, Literature, Nature, Environment, Politics, Society, Psychology, Science, Engineering, Maths, Studying, Teaching		Free access to courses, paid certification			Commercial	2012	UK
The Great Courses	Better Living, Economics & Finance, Fine Arts, High School, History, Literature & Language, Mathematics, Music, Philosophy & Intellectual History, Professional, Religion, Science,	College level	Paid	English	The Teaching Company	Commercial as either a purchase per course or a streaming subscription for multiple courses	1990	US
iversity	Business & Management, IT, Languages, Creative Arts & Media, Healthcare, Medicine, History, Law, Literature, Nature, Environment, Politics, Society, Psychology, Science, Engineering, Maths, Studying, Teaching		Free and paid courses	English		Commercial	2013	EU
Kadenze	Arts, Photography		Free	English		Commercial	2015	US
Khan Academy	General education	Early Childhood Education to university level	Free		Khan Academy	Non-profit	2006	US
Linkedin Learning	Business, Technology		Free trial, then subscription	English		Commercial	1995	US
MIT OCW	Business & Management, IT, Languages, Creative Arts & Media, Healthcare, Medicine, History, Law, Literature, Nature, Environment, Politics, Society, Psychology, Science, Engineering, Maths, Studying, Teaching	College/University level	Free	english	MIT		2001	US
OpenClassrooms	IT, Business & Management, Science, Engineering & Maths		Free & paid courses	English		Commercial	2007	France
openHPI	IT		Free & certificate cost	English, Chinese, German, Spanish		N/A	2012	Germany
OpenLearning	Business & Management, IT, Languages, Creative Arts & Media, Healthcare, Medicine, History, Law, Literature, Nature, Environment, Politics, Society, Psychology, Science, Engineering, Maths, Studying, Teaching	Higher Education, K12	Free & paid courses	many languages		Commercial	2012	Australia
OpenSAP	SAP courses		Free	German, English, French, Chinese		Non-profit	2013	Germany
Open Universities Australia	Business & Management, IT, Languages, Creative Arts & Media, Healthcare, Medicine, History, Law, Literature, Nature, Environment, Politics, Society, Psychology, Science, Engineering, Maths, Studying, Teaching	College, University	Paid	English		Commercial	2013	Australia
Saylor Academy	Business administration, Computer science, Social science, Humanities, etc.	College level	Free	English	?	Non-profit	1999	US
Shaw Academy	Business & Management, IT, Languages, Creative Arts & Media, Healthcare, Medicine, History, Law, Literature, Nature, Environment, Politics, Society, Psychology, Science, Engineering, Maths, Studying, Teaching	Higher Education	Free trial then paid	English		Commercial	2013	Ireland
Stanford Online	Innovation & Thinking design, Cyber Security, AI, Leadership, Health, Medicine, Environment, Energy, Arts, Humanities, Education	University	Free & paid courses	English		Non-profit	2006	US
SWAYAM	Science, Engineering, Humanities, Arts		Free (Fee for Exams and certification)	English, Hindi		Non-profit	2017	India
Udacity	IT, Business, Product management, Career		Free & paid courses	English		Commercial	2012	US
Udemy	Various	Anything from introductory tutorial to professional certification track	Paid (content longer than 2 hours), determined by instructor (content ≤ 2 hours	various		Commercial	2010	US
Wikiversity	?	pre-school to university	Free	18 languages including English, French, Chinese, German, Italian, Russian, Portuguese, and Czech.	?	?	2006	?

== No longer available ==
- Coursmos
- Eliademy

== See also ==
- fast.ai Massive Open Online Course — "Practical Deep Learning for Coders"
- List of educational software
- List of online educational resources
