= CodeSandbox =

Cloud-based online integrated development environment for web development

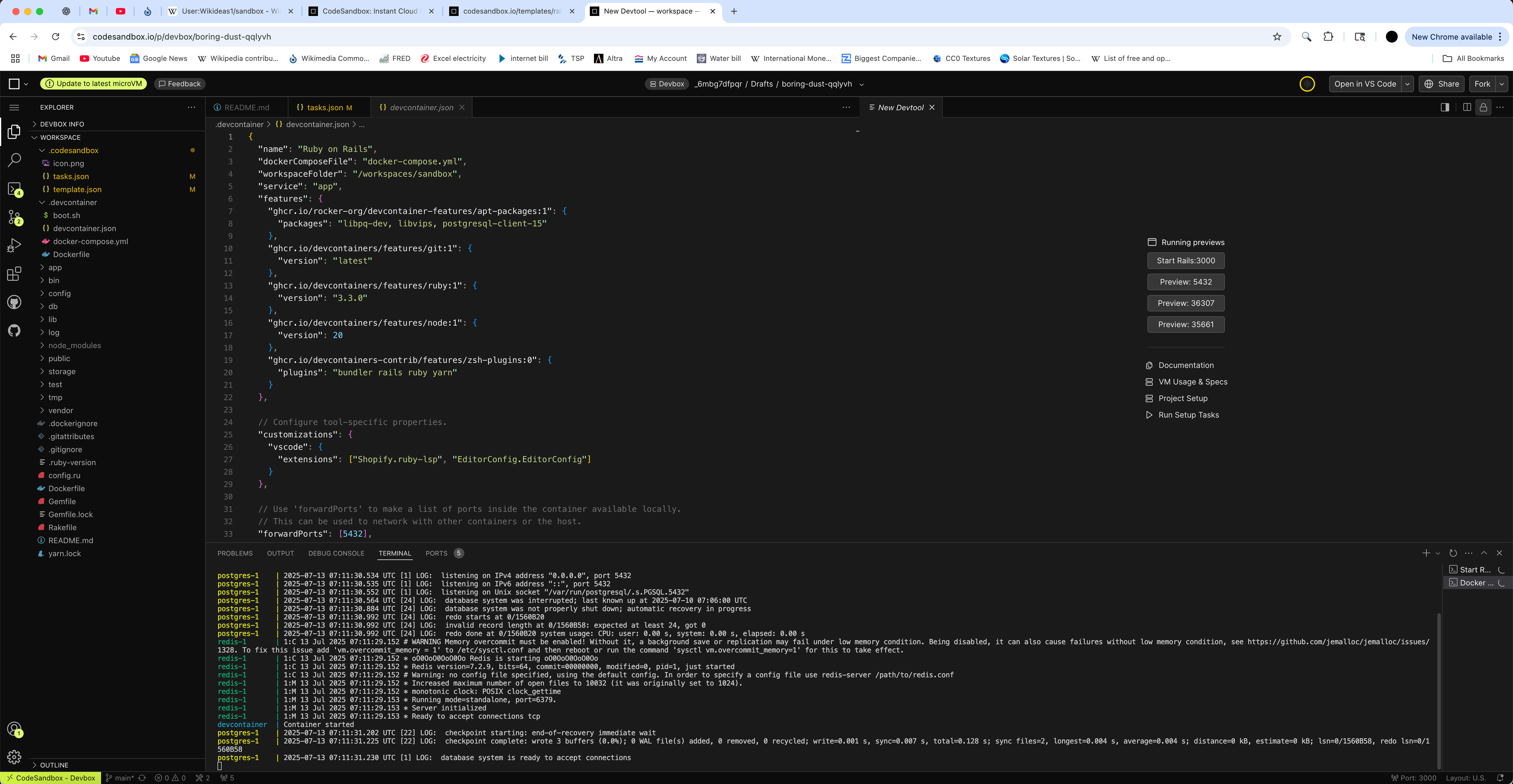
- Developers: Ives van Hoorne; Bas Buursma
- Release: 2017
- Written in: Elixir
- Platform: Web application
- Type: Cloud computing, Online integrated development environment, Web development
- License: Proprietary software Freemium
- Website: codesandbox.io

CodeSandbox is a cloud-based online integrated development environment (IDE) focused on web application development. It supports popular web technologies such as JavaScript, TypeScript, React, Vue.js, and Node.js. CodeSandbox allows users to create, edit, and deploy web applications directly from the browser with zero setup. CodeSandbox is widely used for front-end development, rapid prototyping, sharing code snippets, and real-time collaborative coding. It provides GitHub integration, templates for common frameworks, and a cloud-based development container for full-stack projects.

== Templates ==
- AI code completion
- Angular
- Assemblyline4
- Astro
- Astro Starlight Documentation
- Astro Tailwind Starter
- Bun
- Chakra for React
- Cloudflare Workers (Simple)
- Create-T3-app
- Deno
- Deno Fresh
- Docker
- Docusaurus
- Elixir
- FastHTML Application
- Gatsby
- Gleam
- Go
- Headless Browser (Chromium)
- HTML + CSS
- Hono + Next.js
- JavaScript
- Jupyter
- NEST
- Next.js
- Next.js + Postgres
- Node Express Server
- Node HTTP Server
- Nodebox Starter
- Nuxt
- Nuxt Todos on the Edge
- PHP Starter
- Preact
- Pytorch
- Python
- Python OpenAI
- Python Flask Server
- Python Selenium
- React
- React (Farm FE + TS)
- React (Rsbuild + TS)
- React (TS)
- React Native with Expo
- React Router (Remix)
- Remix
- React + Tailwind CSS
- Ruby on Rails
- Rust
- Rust & Axum
- Rust & Serde
- Rust & Poem REST Server
- Solid (Vite)
- Solid Start
- Storybook (React)
- SvelteKit
- Tailwind CSS
- TanStack Start
- Tensorflow
- Universal
- Vanilla TypeScript
- Vite (JS)
- Vite (TS)
- Vue.js

== Limitations ==
- Slower performance for larger tasks compared to native IDEs
- Some features require a paid subscription
- Performance and storage limits for free-tier users
- Limited offline capabilities

== See also ==
- Comparison of integrated development environments
- Comparison of online source code playgrounds
- Replit
- JSFiddle
- List of online integrated development environments
- List of online educational resources
