= IDX =

The acronym IDX may refer to:

- .idx file extension, used by various programs to represent an index of some kind, commonly used by the DirectVobSub add-on for subtitle files
- ID Experts Holdings, Inc., data breach response company owned by ZeroFox
- IDX Systems, software company, portions now owned by GE and athenahealth
- Project IDX, an online integrated development environment by Google
- Indonesia AirAsia X, former airline with ICAO airline code IDX
- Indonesia Stock Exchange
  - IDX Channel, Indonesian channel jointly owned by Indonesia Stock Exchange and MNC Media
  - IDX Composite, Indonesia Stock Exchange composite index
- Intact dilation and extraction, abortion procedure
- Internet Data Exchange
