= Pressbooks =

- Logo as of August 2022
- Developers: Book Oven, Inc.
- Release: 2011
- Stable release: 5.20.1 / 27 April 2021; 5 years ago
- Written in: PHP
- Platform: WordPress
- Type: content management system
- License: GNU GPLv3
- Website: pressbooks.org
- Repository: https://github.com/pressbooks

Pressbooks is an open source content management system designed for creating books. It is based on WordPress, and can export content in many formats for ebooks, webbooks or print.

== History ==
Pressbooks is developed by Book Oven, Inc., a Montreal-based company founded in 2011 by Hugh McGuire (who also founded the audio book platform LibriVox). Originally aimed at self-publishing authors, in 2017 Pressbooks shifted its focus to work with universities on academic and textbook publishing.

== Overview ==
The software is built on WordPress Multisite with modification of the admin and reader interfaces to reflect the intention of authoring books, a choice of themes for formatting books, and to allow the export of books in print-ready PDF, mobi, ePub, and many other open formats. It is available as a hosted service for self-publishers (pressbooks.com), supported institutional hosting (PressbooksEdu), third party hosts, or self-hosting of the software available from pressbooks.org.

Pressbooks is often used to create open textbooks and other forms of open educational resource, for example at the following institutions:

- University of Hawaii
- University of California, Berkeley
- University of Kansas
- eCampusOntario
- Unizin Consortium
- Indiana University
- Illinois University
- BCcampus
- Michigan State University
- University of Sheffield
