= Comparison of online source code playgrounds =

Notable online software source code playgrounds

The following table lists notable online software source code playgrounds. A playground allows learning about, experimenting with and sharing source code.

== Online compiled source code playgrounds ==
| Playground | Access | C | C++ | Objective-C | Java | Other |
|---|---|---|---|---|---|---|
| code (Note: Multi-language programming playground ~ Code ~ LabStack) | Free | Yes | Yes | Yes | Yes | Bash, C, CoffeeScript, C++, Crystal, C#, D, Dart, Elixir, Erlang, F#, Go, Hack, Haskell, Java, JavaScript, Julia, Kotlin, Lua, Nim, Node.js, OCaml, Objective-C, Perl, PHP, PowerShell, Python, Ruby, R, Rust, Scala, Swift, TypeScript |
| OneCompiler (Note: OneCompiler official website) | Free | Yes | Yes | No | Yes | Ada, Assembly, Bash, C, C++, C#, Clojure, Cobol, CoffeeScript, CommonLisp, CSS, D, Elixir, Erlang, F#, Fortran, Go, Groovy, Haskell, HTML, JavaScript, Kotlin, Lua, OCaml, Octave, Pascal, Perl, PHP, Prolog, Python, R, Racket, Ruby, Rust, Scala, SQL (through MySQL, PostgreSQL, SQLite, MariaDB, Microsoft SQL Server), Swift, Tcl, TypeScript, Visual Basic, VB.NET |
| intervue.io (Note: An easier and efficient way to take remote interviews and compile your code) | Free & Paid | Yes | Yes | No | Yes | Bash, C, C++, Elixir, Erlang, Java, JavaScript, Node.js, PHP, Python, Ruby, R, Rust, Swift, TypeScript, CoffeeScript, Plain Text, HTML/CSS/JavaScript |
| JDoodle | Free | Yes | Yes | Yes | Yes | AWK, Ada, Algol 68, Apl, Assembler, Bash, BC, Befunge, Blockly, Brainf**k, C#, C99, Cow, CLISP, Cobol, Clojure, CoffeeScript, D, Dart, Deno, Erlang, Elixir, F#, Falcon, Fantom, Factor, Forth, Fortran, Free Basic, GO, Groovy, Hack, Haskell, Haxe, HTML/CSS/JavaScript, Icon, Intercal, J Language, Java, JBang, Jelly. Julia, Kotlin, LOLCODE, Lua, MATLAB/Octave, Moonscript, MySQL, Nemerle, Nim, NodeJS, Ocaml, OZ Mozart, Pascal, Picolisp, Pike, Prolog, PHP, Perl, Python, R Language, Racket, Raku, Rhino JS, Ruby, Rust, Scala, Scheme, SmallTalk, SpiderMonkey, SQL, Swift, TCL, TypeScript, Unlambda, VB. Net, VERILOG, Whitespace, YaBasic |
| codepad (Note: codepad Official Site) | Free | Yes | Yes | No | No | D, Haskell, Lua, OCaml, PHP, Perl, Python, Ruby, Scheme, Tcl |
| codiva.io (Note: Codiva.io Online Java Compiler home page) | Free | Yes | Yes | No | Yes | |
| paiza.IO (Note: paiza.IO Official Site) | Free | Yes | Yes | Yes | Yes | Python, Ruby, PHP, Ruby, JavaScript, Objective-C, Kotlin, Scala, Swift, Go, Haskell, Bash, Swift, Rust, Scala, SQL |
| Ideone (Note: Ideone Official Site) | Free | Yes | Yes | Yes | Yes | Ada 95, Common Lisp, Prolog, Assembler 32 bit, Common Lisp, JavaScript, D, Assembler 64 bit, Kotlin, R, AWK, Lua, Racket, Dart, Nemerle, Rust, BC, Elixir, Nice, Scala, BrainFuck, Erlang, Nim, Scheme, F#, Node.js, Fantom, Forth, OCaml, Smalltalk, C99, Fortran, Octave, TCL, Clips, Go, Perl, Python, Text, Clojure, Gosu, Pico Lisp, Unlambda, Cobol, Groovy, Pike, VB.NET, Icon, Prolog, Whitespace, CoffeeScript, Intercal, PHP, Ruby, SQLite, Pascal, Swift |
| onlinegdb (Note: onlinegdb Official Site) | Free | Yes | Yes | Yes | Yes | Assembly, Bash, C#, CSS, Fortran, Go, Haskell, HTML, JavaScript, JavaScript (Rhino), Pascal, Perl, PHP, Prolog, Python, R, Ruby, Rust, SQLite, Swift, Visual Basic |
| Replit (Note: Replit Official Site) | Free | Yes | Yes | No | Yes | Clojure, Haskell, Kotlin, QBasic, Forth, LOLCODE, BrainFuck, Emoticon, Bloop, Unlambda, JavaScript, CoffeeScript, Scheme, APL, Lua, Ruby, PHP, Python, Node.js, Enzyme, Go, Java, C++, C, C#, F#, HTML, CSS, JavaScript, Rust, Swift, Django, Express, Sinatra, Ruby on Rails, R, Next.js, GatsbyJS, React, React TypeScript, React Reason, Bash, Quil, TypeScript |
| Rextester (Note: Rextester Official Site) | Free | Yes | Yes | Yes | Yes | Ada, Assembly, Bash, C#, JavaScript (client side), Common Lisp, D, Elixir, Erlang, F#, Fortran, Go, Haskell, Java, JavaScript, Kotlin, Lua, MySQL, Node.js, OCaml, Octave, Oracle SQL, Pascal, Perl, PHP, PostgreSQL, Prolog, Python, Python 3, R, Ruby, Scala, Scheme, SQL Server, Swift, Tcl, Visual Basic. |
| myCompiler (Note: myCompiler Official website) | Free | Yes | Yes | No | Yes | Assembly, Bash, C#, Clojure, D, Erlang, Fortran, Go, Lua, Node.js, PHP, Perl, Python, R, Ruby, SQL. |
| Compiler Explorer (Note: Compiler Explorer official website) | Free | Yes | Yes | No | Yes | Ada, Assembly, C, C#, C++, Clean, Crystal, D, Dart, Erlang, F#, Fortran, Go, Haskell, HLSL, Java, Koltin, MLIR, Nim, Ocaml, Pascal, Pony, Python, Racket, Ruby, Rust, Scala, Solidity, TypeScript, Visual Basic and Zig (through several compilers and compilers' versions plus few ergonomic IDE’s features). |
| .NET Fiddle (Note: .NET Fiddle Official website) | Free | No | No | No | No | C# (Framework / Core), F# (Framework / Core), VB.NET (Framework) |
| Try It Online (Note: Try It Online) | Free | Yes | Yes | Yes | Yes | ABC, ABC-assembler, Ada, Agda, ALGOL 68, Alice ML, APL, Appleseed, ASPeRiX, Assembly, ATS2, Attache, AWK, B, Bash, bc, BeanShell, Boo, bosh, Bracmat, Brat, C, C#, C++, Caboose, CakeML, calc, Ceylon, Chapel, Charm, Checked C, Cheddar, Chez Scheme, CHICKEN Scheme, CIL, cixl, Clean, CLIPS, Clojure, COBOL, Cobra, Coconut, CoffeeScript, Common Lisp, CPY, Cryptol, Crystal, Curry, Cyclone, D, Dafny, Dart, Dash, dc, dg, DScript, Dyvil, C, C++, ed, Egel, ELF, Elixir, Emacs Lisp, Erlang, es, Euphoria, F#, Factor, Fantom, Farnsworth, Felix, fish, FOCAL-69, Forth, Fortran, Funky, Gambit Scheme, GAP, Gema, gnuplot, Go, Granule, Groovy, Guile, Gwion, HadesLang, Haskell, Haxe, Hobbes, Huginn, Hy, Icon, Idris, ink, Io, J, Java, JavaScript, Joy, jq, Julia, Jx, K, Kobeři-C, Koka, Kotlin, ksh, Lean, Lily, Literate Haskell, LLVM IR, Lua, M4, Make, Mamba, Mathics, Maxima, Moonscript, Mouse, MUMPS, MY-BASIC, Nial, Nim, Oberon-07, Object Pascal, Objective-C, OCaml, occam-pi, Octave, Odin, OSH, P#, Pari/GP, Pascal, Perl, Phoenix, PHP, Physica, PicoLisp, Pike, PILOT, Pony, Positron, PostScript, PowerShell, PowerShell Core, Prolog, Proton, Pure, PureScript, Python, Q#, R, Racket, RAD, Rapira, Reason, REBOL, Red, Rexx, Ring, rk, Ruby, Rust, Röda, Scala, sed, sfk, Shnap, Sidef, Simula, SISAL, SNOBOL4, SQLite, Squirrel, Stacked, Standard ML, Swift, Tcl, tcsh, TemplAt, TypeScript, uBASIC, Ursala, V, Vala, Visual Basic .NET, VSL, WebAssembly, Wolfram Language, Wren, Yabasic, yash, Z3, Zephyr, Zig, zkl, Zoidberg, Zsh. |

== Online web client-side source code playgrounds ==
| Playground | Access | HTML | CSS | JavaScript | Collaborative | Embeddable | Other |
|---|---|---|---|---|---|---|---|
| CodePen (Note: CodePen Official website) | Free & Paid | Yes | Yes | Yes | No | Yes | HAML, Markdown, Slim, Jade, Less, Sass, Stylus, CoffeeScript, LiveScript, TypeScript, Babel (ES6) |
| Coder Online IDE (Note: Coder Online IDE Official Site) | Free | Yes | Yes | Yes | Yes | Yes | Batch, Clojure, CoffeeScript, CSS, C++, Go, HTML, Java, JavaScript, JSON, Markdown, PHP, Python, Ruby, Rust, TypeScript, Visual Basic, XML |
| CSSDesk (Note: CSS Desk Official website) | Free | Yes | Yes | No | No | No | |
| JS Bin (Note: JS Bin Official website) | Free & Paid | Yes | Yes | Yes | No | No | CSS Less/Myth/Sass, CoffeeScript, jQuery, Processing.js |
| intervue.io (Note: An easy and efficient way to take remote interviews and compile code) | Free & Paid | Yes | Yes | Yes | Yes | No | Supports all JavaScript and CSS libraries |
| JSFiddle (Note: JSFiddle Official website) | Free | Yes | Yes | Yes | Yes | Yes | CoffeeScript, jQuery, Processing.js, Sass, TypeScript, Babel (ES6), dozens of included JavsScript libraries |
| JSitor (Note: JSitor Official website) | Free | Yes | Yes | Yes | Yes | Yes | Supports all JavaScript and CSS libraries. |
| sequential (Note: sequential) | Free | No | No | Yes | No | Yes | |
| JQ.VER.SION (Note: JQ.VER.SION Official website) | Free | Yes | Yes | Yes | No | No | jQuery |
| Khan Academy (Note: Khan Academy Official website) | Free | No | No | Yes | No | No | |
| Mozilla Thimble (Note: Mozilla's Official Thimble Site) | Free | Yes | Yes | Yes | No | No | Add & manage files; light & dark themes; create/follow embedded tutorials; responsive design testing mode |
| Webpaw (Note: Webpaw Official Site) | Free | Yes | Yes | Yes | Yes | Yes | Less, TypeScript, development assets, import from HTML/GitHub, social login, multiple layouts |
| Liveweave (Note: Liveweave Official website) | Free | Yes | Yes | Yes | Yes | No | |
| Plunker (Note: Plunker Official website) | Free | Yes | Yes | Yes | Yes | No | Many other JavaScript libs including AngularJS |
| PhpFiddle (Note: PhpFiddle Official website) | Free | Yes | Yes | Yes | No | No | Provided multiple popular JavaScript libraries |
| W3Schools (Note: W3Schools Official website) | Free | Yes | Yes | Yes | No | No | jQuery, tutorials |
| WebFiddle (Note: WebFiddle Official website) | Free | No | Yes | Yes | No | No | |
| Occtle (Note: Occtle Official website) | Free & Paid | Yes | Yes | Yes | Yes | Yes | HAML, Markdown, Jade, Less, Sass, Stylus, CoffeeScript, LiveScript, TypeScript, Babel (ES6) |
| LiveGap Editor (Note: LiveGap Editor) | Free | Yes | Yes | Yes | No | No | Less |
| ScratchPad (Note: ScratchPad) | Free | Yes | Yes | No | Yes | No | |
| Runnable (Note: Runnable) | Free | Yes | Yes | Yes | No | No | |
| jsdo.it (Note: jsdo.it) | Free | Yes | Yes | Yes | No | No | |
| snip2code (Note: snip2code) | Free | Yes | Yes | Yes | No | No | |

== Online web server-side source code playgrounds ==
| Playground | Access | PHP | Ruby/Rails | Python/Django | SQL | Other |
|---|---|---|---|---|---|---|
| dbfiddle (Note: dbfiddle Official website) | Free | No | No | No | Yes | Db2, Firebird, MariaDB, MySQL, Node.js, Oracle, Postgres, SQL Server, SQLite, YugabyteDB |
| ExtendsClass (Note: ExtendsClass Official website) | Free | Yes | No | No | Yes | MySQL, SQLite (SQL.js) |
| PhpFiddle (Note: PhpFiddle Official website) | Free | Yes | No | No | Yes | MySQL, SQLite |
| runnable | Free | Yes | Yes | Yes | No | |
| SQL Fiddle (Note: SQL Fiddle Official website) | Free | No | No | No | Yes | MySQL, Oracle, PostgreSQL, SQLite (WebSQL), SQLite (SQL.js) |
| W3Schools | Free | Yes | No | No | Yes | tutorials |

== See also ==
- Integrated development environment
- List of compilers
- List of online integrated development environments
- Source-code editor
