= Codeanywhere =

Cloud integrated development environment

Codeanywhere is a cross-platform cloud integrated development environment (IDE) created by Codeanywhere, Inc. Codeanywhere enables users to write, edit, collaborate, and run web development projects from a web browser or mobile device.

Codeanywhere is written in JavaScript. The editor is based on CodeMirror and uses OpenVZ containers for the development environments. Codeanywhere is platform agnostic, enabling the user to run code in Codeanywhere's environments called DevBoxes or connect to their own VMs via SSH or FTP protocol and also connect to Dropbox and Google Drive. The environment supports more than 75 programming languages, including HTML, JavaScript, Node.js, io.js PHP, Ruby, Python, and Go.

In 2017, the company acquired Codebender, another cloud IDE. Codebender is used to develop for Arduino devices.

== History ==
In 2009, the predecessor to Codeanywhere, PHPanywhere, was launched. PHPanywhere was a web-based FTP client and text editor designed for PHP. That project stayed idle until May 22, 2013, when the founders launched Codeanywhere. The founders, Ivan Burazin and Vedran Jukić, reside in Split, Croatia.

Codeanywhere raised $600,000 from World Wide Web Hosting on July 15, 2013. In August 2014, Codeanywhere was accepted in Techstars's Fall Boston Class. In 2014, as part of the TechCrunch Disrupt NY Conference, the audience voted Codeanywhere the best company in Startup Alley.

In 2022 following the new trend of Cloud Developer Environments or CDEs (including GitHub Codespaces), Codeanywhere launched its new Beta project utilising Infrastructure as Code to relieve developers of having to configure development environments.

On June 7, 2026 Codeanywhere shared a blogpost, that the service will be turned off. The end will be on July the first 2026. They argued this step with the changed "world of development".

== See also ==
- Online integrated development environment
