= MarkEdit =

- Original authors: Ying Zhong, et al.
- Developer: MarkEdit.app
- Release: February 6, 2023; 3 years ago
- Stable release: 1.37.0 (18 October 2026; 16 days ago)
- Written in: Swift, TypeScript
- Operating system: macOS
- Platform: x86-64, ARM (Apple Silicon)
- Available in: English, Chinese
- Type: Text editor
- License: MIT License
- Website: github.com/MarkEdit-app/MarkEdit
- Repository: github.com/MarkEdit-app/MarkEdit

MarkEdit is a free and open-source Markdown editor for macOS. It supports extensions, is built on CodeMirror, and is designed to balance size, speed, native integration, and correctness. The editor follows GitHub Flavored Markdown and does not add any proprietary syntax. Softpedia named MarkEdit an Editor's Pick.

Early test builds of MarkEdit were distributed through TestFlight. MarkEdit was available on the Mac App Store, but starting with version 1.15 it has been released only on GitHub.
