= IT assistant =

An Information Technology Assistant (commonly abbreviated to IT Assistant) is a person who works as an assistant in the IT business.

Because the term "Information Technology" is commonly abbreviated "IT", job seekers recruiters often use the abbreviated version of the title.

== Information Technology Assistant ==
Distinguishing Characteristics: Receives supervision and direction from the Information Technology Manager and Network Specialist. May require flexible work schedules including early morning, weekend and evening hours.

== Qualifications ==
Applicants should have:

- Bachelor or associate degree in Information Technology or related field like Computer Science, Electronics, Software, Information Systems, Telecommunication, Electrical or a diploma/certificate in Information Technology, Computing Studies or a related discipline;
- Two years’ post-qualification experience in help desk services; and
- Good interpersonal and communication skills.
- IT certifications to look for are CompTIA, Cisco, Microsoft and W3Schools depending on the project or information systems maintenance needs.

== Duties ==
As an Information Technology Assistant, user problems should be resolved by communicating with end users and by translating technical problems from end-users to technical support staff. You would install hardware, software, and peripherals; run diagnostic software; utilize mainframe and/or client server software to provide system security access; and accommodate user requests for computer hardware and software.
