= Anthony Goldbloom =

Australian businessman (born 1983)

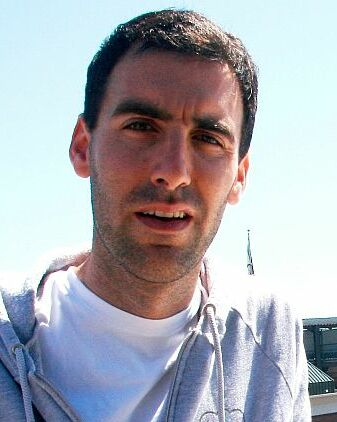
- Born: June 21, 1983 (age 43); Melbourne, Australia
- Education: University of Melbourne
- Occupations: Founder and Former CEO of Kaggle

Anthony John Goldbloom (born 21 June 1983) is the founder and former CEO of Kaggle, a data science competition platform which has used predictive modelling competitions to solve data problems for companies, such as NASA, Wikipedia, Ford and Deloitte. Kaggle has operated across a range of fields, including mapping dark matter and HIV/AIDS research. Kaggle has received considerable media attention following news that it had received $11.25 million in Series A funding from a round led by Khosla Ventures and Index Ventures.

Goldbloom has been cited by Forbes Magazine as one of the 30 Under 30 in Technology, profiled by Fast Company as part of its 'Who's Next?' series and by the Sydney Morning Herald. Goldbloom has been quoted in the New York Times, the Wall Street Journal, the Independent and has appeared on the Science Show Catalyst. In 2021, he joined AIX Ventures as an Investment Partner. AIX Ventures is a venture capital fund that invests in artificial intelligence startups.

Goldbloom later co-founded Sumble, a sales-intelligence startup, with Ben Hamner. Sumble launched in April 2024 and emerged from stealth in October 2025.

== Background ==
Goldbloom was born in Melbourne, Australia, and holds a first-class honours degree in Economics and Econometrics from the University of Melbourne. During high school, Goldbloom represented Australia in sailing, competing in the 2001 World Championships in Sydney in the 29er class. Goldbloom began his career working in the economic modeling unit of Australia's Department of Treasury and later spent time in the Research department at the Reserve Bank of Australia. He conceived of the idea behind Kaggle while working as an intern at The Economist in London, when he was asked to write an article on the emerging area of "big data".

== Personal life ==
Goldbloom lives with his wife in San Francisco, California, where Kaggle is headquartered.
