= Google Colab =

Cloud-based Jupyter Notebook environment

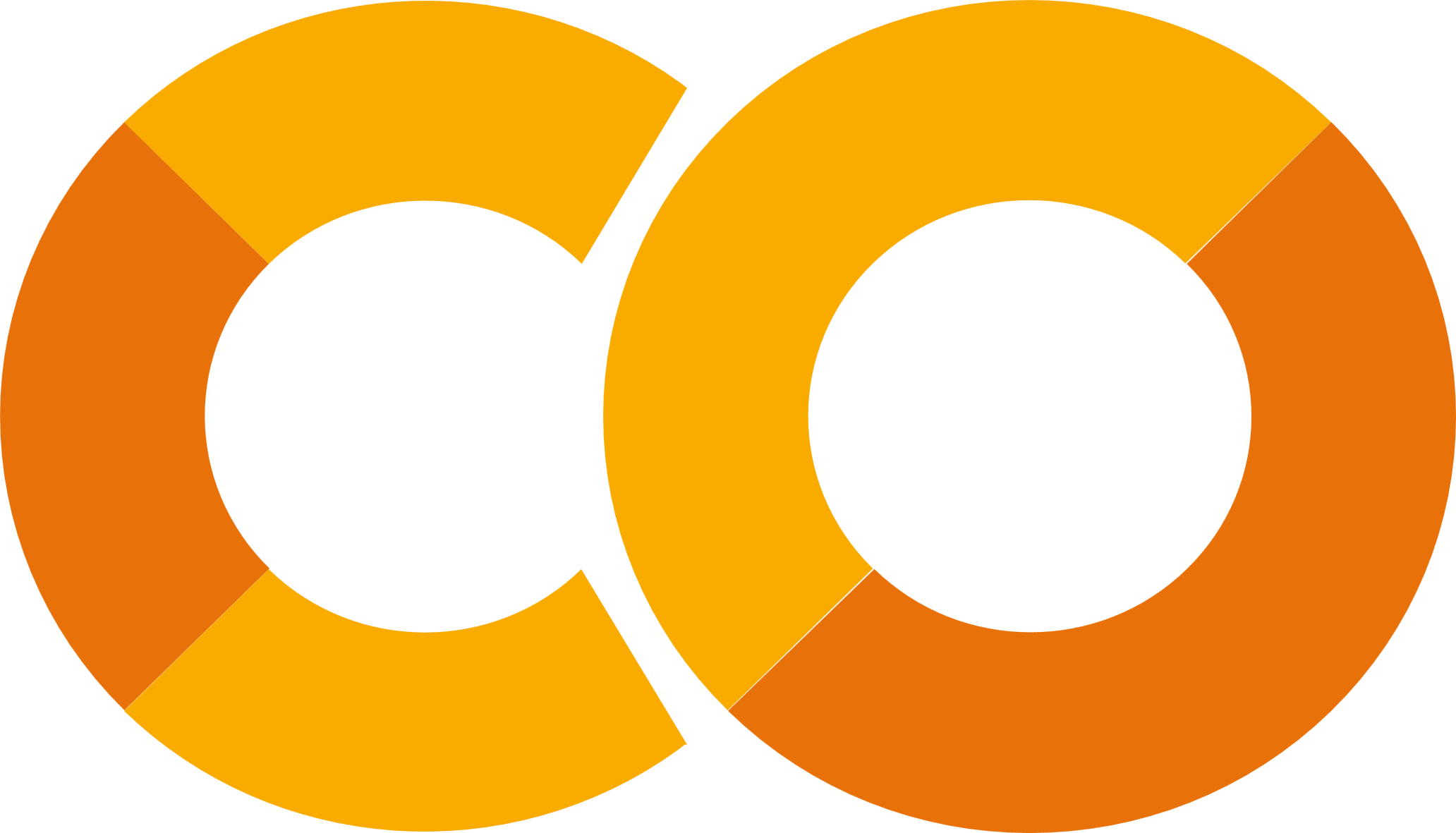
- Developer: Google Research
- Release: 2017; 9 years ago
- Platform: Web application
- Type: Cloud computing, Jupyter Notebook, Machine learning
- License: Proprietary software Freemium
- Website: colab.research.google.com

Google Colab is a free, cloud-based Jupyter Notebook environment provided by Google. It allows users to write and execute Python code through the browser, especially suited for machine learning, data analysis, and education. Google Colab provides an online integrated development environment (IDE) for Python that requires no setup and runs entirely in the cloud. It offers free access to computing resources, including GPUs and TPUs, making it popular among researchers and students working on deep learning and data science projects.

== Features ==
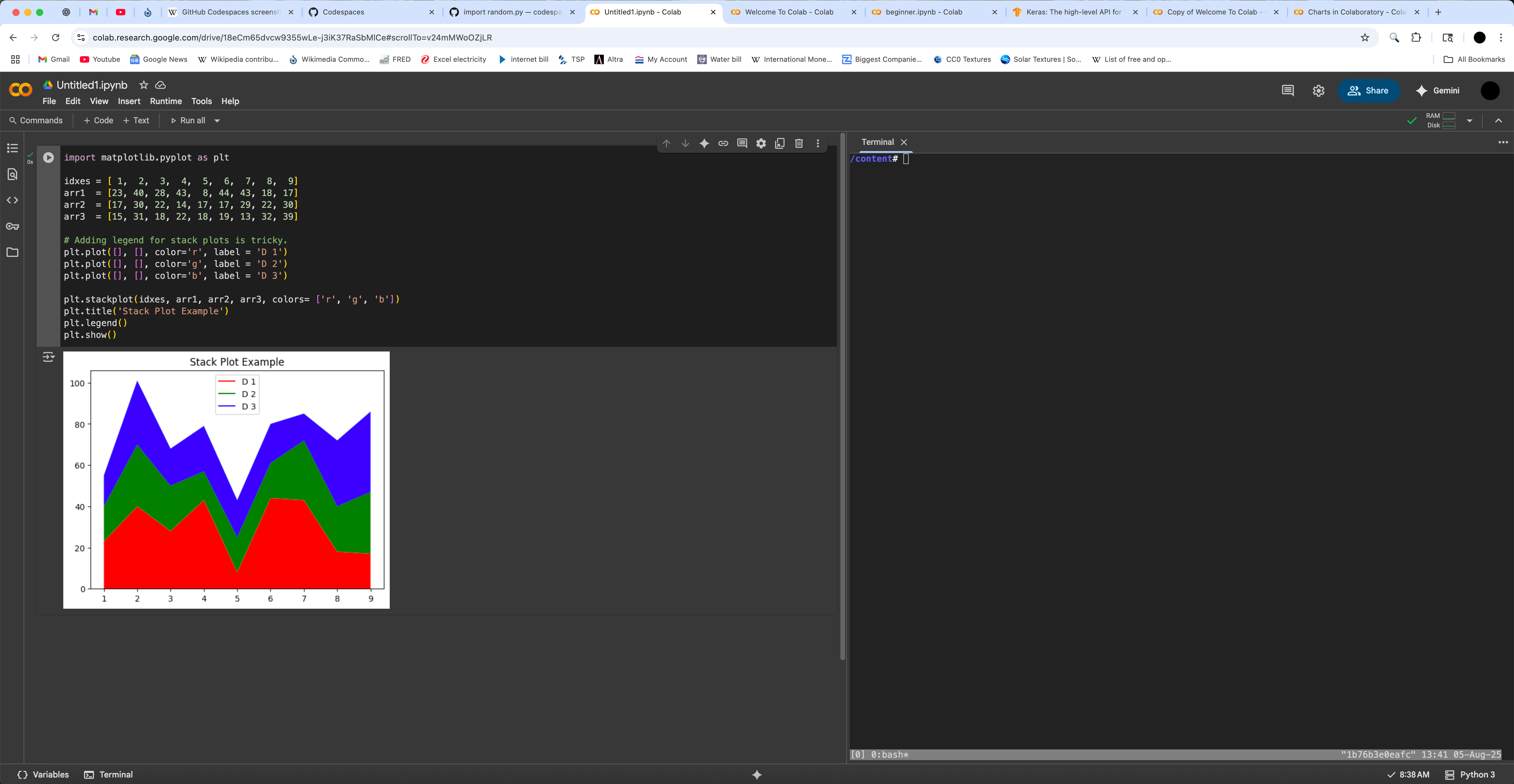
Google Colab screenshot

- Supports Python 3, R, and Julia
- Built on top of Jupyter Notebook
- Free access to limited GPU/TPU computing resources
- Integration with Google Drive for saving and loading notebooks
- Ability to share notebooks like Google Docs
- Multiple users can collaborate and work on the same document at the same time
- Compatible with popular machine learning libraries such as TensorFlow, PyTorch, and scikit-learn

== Limitations ==
- Idle timeouts and session limits
- Limited access to high-performance hardware without a paid subscription

== See also ==
- Amazon SageMaker – Cloud machine-learning platform
- CoCalc — does Jupyter notebooks, Markdown, LaTeX, RMarkdown, Linux terminal, SageMath, GNU Octave.
- Firebase Studio and Google Cloud Shell – other online IDEs from Google
- GitHub Codespaces – Online integrated development environment platform from GitHub
- Kaggle § Kaggle Notebooks
- Termux – Terminal emulator for Android, useful for additional recent packages
- List of online integrated development environments
- List of online educational resources
- List of Python software
- List of data science software
- Comparison of machine learning software
