= Online integrated development environment =

Browser-based software development tool

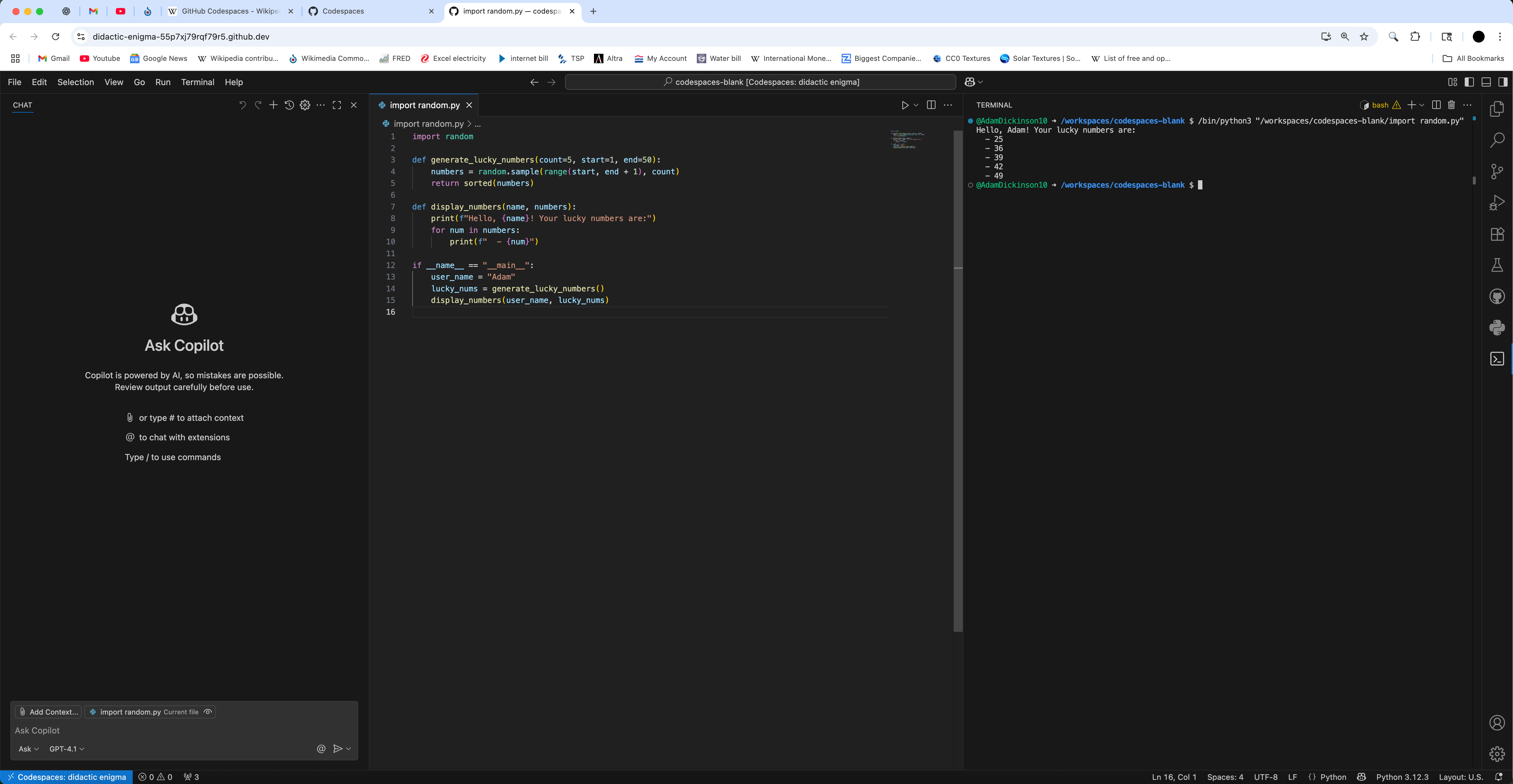
The GitHub Codespaces layout: the GitHub Copilot interface on the left, the code editor in the center, and the terminal on the right.

An online integrated development environment, also known as a web IDE or cloud IDE, is an integrated development environment (IDE) that can be accessed from a web browser. Online IDEs can be used without downloads or installation, instead operating fully within modern web browsers such as Firefox, Google Chrome or Microsoft Edge. Online IDEs can enable software development on low-powered devices that are normally unsuitable. An online IDE does not usually contain all of the same features as a traditional desktop IDE, only basic IDE features such as a source-code editor with syntax highlighting. Integrated version control and read–eval–print loop (REPL) may also be included.

== Notable examples ==
- Amazon SageMaker
- Cloud9 IDE (discontinued for new users)
- CoCalc
- Codeanywhere
- CodePen
- CodeSandbox
- DartPad
- Eclipse Che
- Firebase Studio, formerly Project IDX
- GitHub Codespaces
- Glitch
- Google Cloud Shell
- Google Colab
- Google AI Studio
- IBM Watson Studio
- JDoodle
- JSFiddle
- JupyterLab
- Kaggle Notebooks
- Project Jupyter
- Replit
- SourceLair

== See also ==
- Comparison of integrated development environments
- Comparison of online source code playgrounds
- List of educational software for programming
- List of integrated development environments
- List of online educational resources
