= William Stein =

William Stein may refer to:

- William A. Stein (born 1974), computer programmer and mathematician
- William Howard Stein (1911–1980), biochemist
- Willie Stein (died 2009), television producer and songwriter
- Bill Stein (born 1947), American baseball player
- Bill Stein (American football) (1899–1983), American football offensive lineman

== See also ==
- Randy Stein (William Randolph Stein, 1953–2011), baseball pitcher
