= SourceLair =

Online integrated development environment

- Developer(s): Sourcelair Ltd.
- Written in: Python/Django
- Platform: Web
- Type: Online IDE
- Website: www.sourcelair.com

SourceLair is an online IDE (integrated development environment) that lets you code in more than 25 programming languages and frameworks, while it integrates with Git, GitHub and Heroku.

== Features ==
Code in the browser.

== See also ==
- Django (web framework)
- Online integrated development environment
