= Lyryx Learning =

Educational software company

- Company type: Private
- Industry: Higher education publisher, Online Learning and Assessment, Open educational resources, Online Homework, Open Textbook Publisher
- Founded: 2000
- Headquarters: Calgary, Alberta, Canada
- Area served: Global
- Key people: Claude Laflamme; (Co-Founder); Keith Nicholson; (Co-founder); Bruce Bauslaugh; (Board Member)
- Products: Open source textbooks and content for the higher education market, online formative assessments
- Website: lyryx.com

Lyryx Learning (Lyryx) was an educational software company for 23 years [2000-2023] offering open educational resources (OERs) paired with online formative assessment and other educational software for undergraduate introductory courses in Mathematics & Statistics and Business & Economics.

== History ==
In 1997, Claude Laflamme and Keith Nicholson, Professors in the Department of Mathematics and Statistics at the University of Calgary, began work on the design of online tools to support student learning in their classes. Laflamme and Nicholson developed and implemented a formative assessment system which provided immediate, substantive feedback to students based on their work.

In 2000, Laflamme and Nicholson, together with two software developers, Bruce Bauslaugh and Richard Cannings, formed Lyryx Learning Inc., to offer this platform in a number of quantitative disciplines. By 2010, Lyryx supported approximately 100,000 students and 2,000 instructors per year in Canada.

After several years of developing formative online assessment for content from various publishers, including McGraw-Hill Ryerson in Canada and Flat World Knowledge in the US, Lyryx became a fully independent publisher supporting OERs in 2013, with the launch of Lyryx with Open Texts.

In 2023, Lyryx merged with the high education division of Vretta to form Vretta-Lyryx Inc (VLI). Thus Lyryx ceased to exist as its own entity.

Finally in 2024, VLI was acquired by Harris Computer Systems.

== Lyryx with Open Texts ==
To support the use of OERs in undergraduate introductory courses in Mathematics & Statistics and Business & Economics, Lyryx had moved to a social enterprise business model: Funding from the online homework supported both the development and maintenance of OERs as well as contributions to the community. In addition, Lyryx also offered an option of free access to their online homework from an institution's computer labs, hence providing an entirely free option for students in need.

Lyryx with Open Texts included:

- Adapted Open Texts: Open textbooks distributed at no cost, and editorial services to adapt the open textbooks for each specific course. All textbooks were licensed under a Creative Commons license.
- Formative Online Assessment: Algorithmically generated homework and examination questions were automatically graded, and students received individualized feedback on their work.
- Course Supplements: A wide variety of materials to support the instructor, including slides and solutions manuals. For select products, Lyryx offered source codes in an editable format in LaTeX so instructors could adapt the content themselves.
- User Support: In-house support for both instructors and students, 365 days/year.

== List of Textbooks ==
Lyryx with Open Texts - Calculus

Accounting

- Introduction to Financial Accounting
- Introduction to Financial Accounting: US GAAP
- Intermediate Financial Accounting Volume I
- Intermediate Financial Accounting Volume II

Economics

- Principles of Microeconomics
- Principles of Macroeconomics
- Principles of Economics

Mathematics

- Calculus: Early Transcendentals
- Linear Algebra with Applications
- A First Course in Linear Algebra

Business Mathematics

- Business Math: A Step-by-Step Handbook

== Repositories ==
In addition to its website lyryx.com, Lyryx Learning open textbooks were also listed in the following OER repositories:

- Merlot
- OER Commons
- BCcampus
- Manitoba Open Textbook Initiative
- eCampus Ontario Open Textbook Library
- National Network for Equitable Library Service (NNLES)
- Oasis Geneseo Open Textbook Search/State University of New York
- Open Textbook Library/University of Minnesota
- Saylor
- San Diego Community College District OER

== OpenStax Ally ==
Lyryx was an OpenStax Ally for the products listed below. The texts and supplementary resources were provided by OpenStax, and Lyryx provided corresponding online assessment and support.

- Principles of Accounting, Volume 1: Financial Accounting
- Principles of Accounting, Volume 2: Managerial Accounting
- Calculus
- Introductory Statistics
- Introductory Business Statistics

== Awards ==
Lyryx Learning was a 2019 winner of "Outstanding Achievement in Information and Communications Technology" as part of the 30th Annual ASTech Awards.

Lyryx with Open Texts received a "2017 Honorable Mention" from the Open Education Consortium
