= Open Training Institute =

- Type: Registered Training Organisation
- Active: 2013–2017
- Location: Bourke Street, Melbourne, Victoria 3000, Australia, Headquarters in Melbourne, Australia
- Campus: Distance learning
- Website: www.opentraining.edu.au

Open Training Institute was an online registered training organisation (RTO) based in Australia, owned by Open Universities Australia.

Open Training Institute offered online Vocational Education Training (VET) courses across a number of business disciplines.

While the majority of enrolled students were based in Australia, courses were available to students internationally. With no entry requirements and no student quotas for courses, the Institute was "open" for all.

Open Training Institute offered 24 business qualifications online and provided two ways to study: self-paced or in a structured class.

== Background ==
Open Training Institute was owned by Open Universities Australia.

== History ==
Open Training Institute launched on 27 December 2013. According to their official website, accessed 18 August 2017, "On 1 March 2016, Open Training Institute (RTO 40766) went into a teach-out phase and as a result, ceased all business operations as of 30 June 2017."

== Y Factor ==
Open Training Institute launched with a brand advertising campaign featuring a fictional talent show called Y Factor. The advertisements featured Australian TV stars Mark Holden and Kimberly Davies as celebrity judges.

The talents of the fictional contestants featured on the Y Factor were a claw machinist, an extreme dog groomer, a slipper kicker, a dance cup stacker, an anthem gargler, a food juggler, and a gymnastic spoonist.
