= Amjad Masad =

Jordanian-American businessman

Amjad Masad (Arabic: أمجد مسعد; born 1987 or 1988) is a Jordanian-American billionaire entrepreneur. He is the founder and CEO of Replit. Before Replit, Masad worked at Facebook, overseeing the JavaScript infrastructure team and also as a founding engineer at Codecademy.

== Early life ==
Amjad Masad was born and raised in Amman, Jordan, in a modest family with Palestinian heritage. His father, a civil engineer from a Palestinian refugee background, emphasized the importance of education. Masad later moved to the United States for opportunities in technology.

== Career ==
Masad is a computer science graduate from Princess Sumaya University for Technology in Jordan. After moving from Jordan, he worked various jobs in Silicon Valley, including a stint as a software engineer at Facebook from October 2013 to April 2016. Before Facebook, Masad was a founding engineer at Codecademy from November 2011 to October 2013.

In 2016, he co-founded Replit. It was established as an online integrated development environment (IDE) by Masad, his wife Haya Odeh, and his brother Faris.
