= Google Cloud Shell =

Online bash shell based on Debian

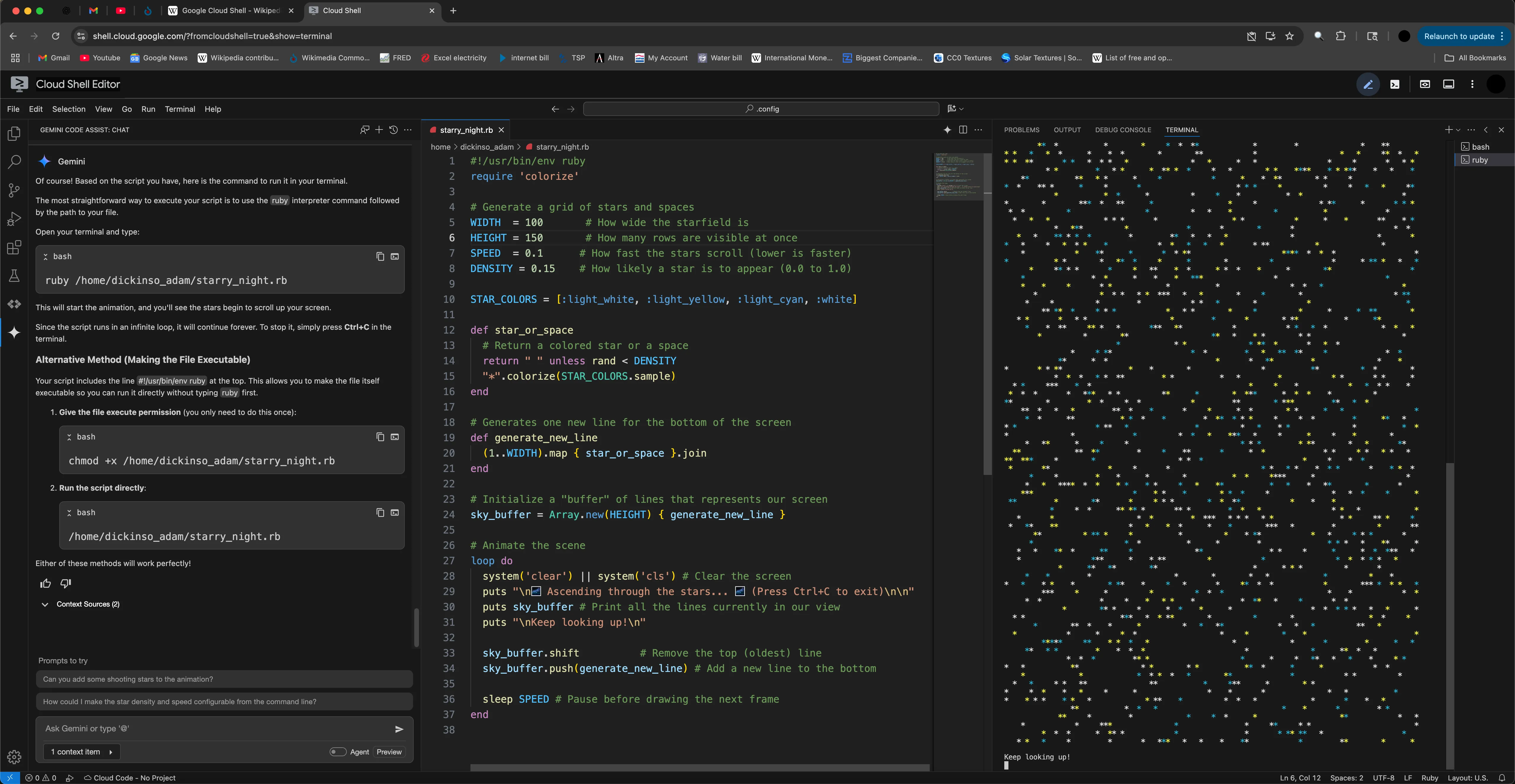
- Cloud Shell Editor running a starry night animation in Ruby, vibe coded with Google Gemini on the left.
- Release: 2016
- Written in: C, Java, JavaScript, C++, Python, Go, Ruby
- Operating system: Arch Linux
- Website: https://cloud.google.com/shell

Google Cloud Shell is an online integrated development environment (IDE) provided by Google Cloud Platform (GCP). It is a Ubuntu-based virtual machine (with a persistent 5 GB home directory), allowing users to manage their GCP resources and projects directly from their web browser. Google Cloud Shell is available to all Google Cloud users, including those on the free tier, at no additional cost. It can be accessed directly from the Google Cloud Console or through the Google Cloud SDK.

== Features ==
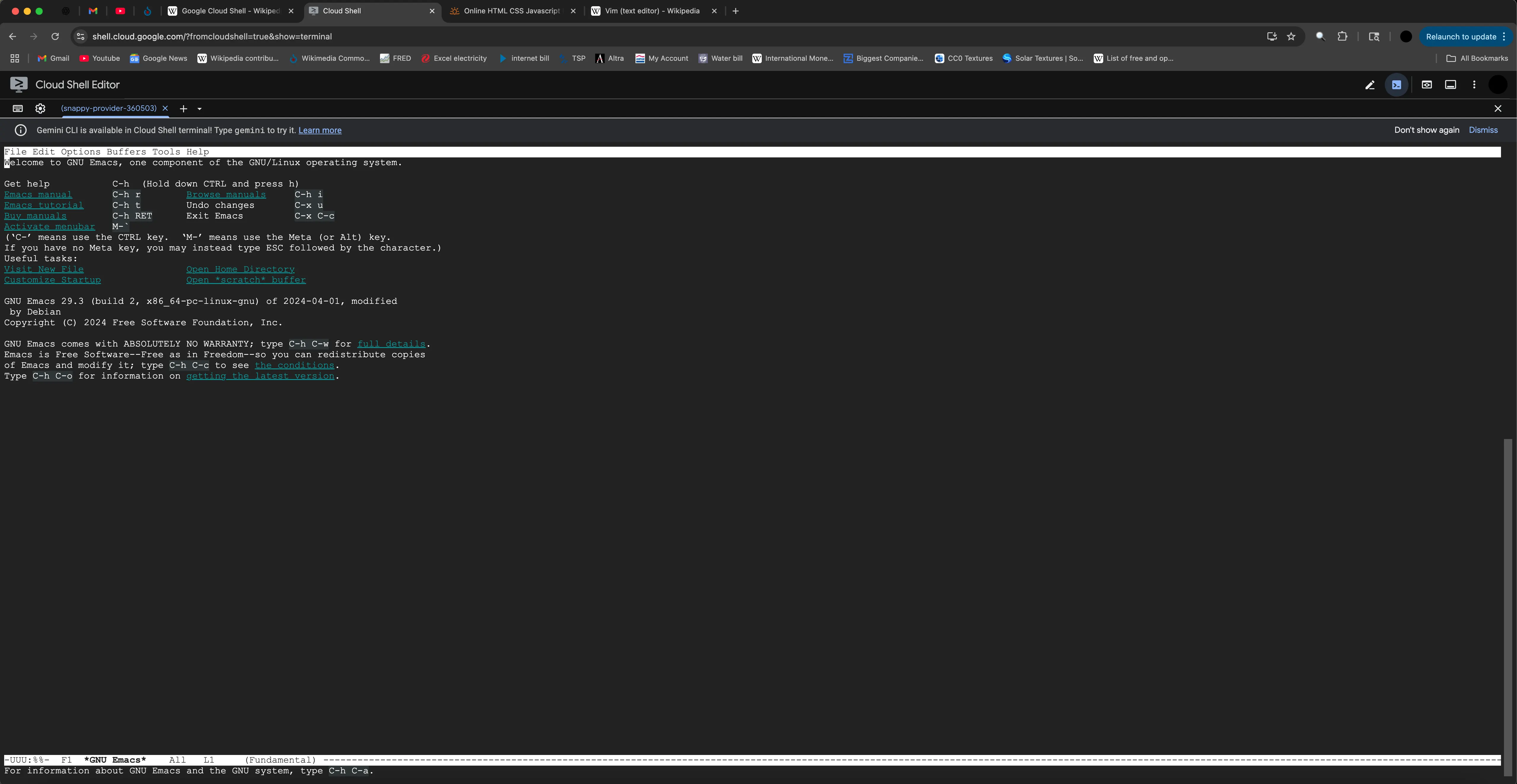
Cloud Shell Editor runs GNU Emacs, Vim, and Vim Tutor

- Persistent Storage
  The Cloud Shell environment comes pre-installed with a variety of development tools and utilities, including the Google Cloud SDK (gcloud), Git, Docker, and various programming language runtimes and tools.
- Web-based Code Editor
  Cloud Shell features a web-based code editor based on Eclipse Theia, allowing users to develop, build, debug, and test their applications directly from the browser.
- Secure Remote Access
  Cloud Shell supports OpenSSH for secure remote access, enabling users to connect to their Cloud Shell instance from various devices and locations.Automatic
- Project and Authentication
  When a user launches Cloud Shell, it automatically sets the active GCP project and authenticates the user, streamlining the process of managing cloud resources.

== Limitations ==
While Cloud Shell provides a powerful and convenient development environment, it has some limitations:

- The root file system is volatile, meaning that any changes made outside the user's home directory will be lost when the session ends.
- Users cannot expand the persistent storage beyond the default 5 GB allocation.
- Cloud Shell instances are automatically terminated after an hour of inactivity, and users must manually restart the session if needed.
- Limited to 50 hours of free use per week.

== See also ==
- Google Colab
- Programming education
