= AI Darwin Awards =

The AI Darwin Awards are a satirical online awards program launched in 2025 to highlight reckless or ill-considered uses of artificial intelligence. They focus on human decisions surrounding the deployment of AI systems. Although inspired by the Darwin Awards, they are not affiliated with the original awards.

== Format ==
The awards' website collects accounts of AI failures. It invites nominations from the public. Nomination criteria emphasize poor judgment, ignored warning signs, and public impact.

Early nominees reported in September 2025 included Replit, following the deletion of a production database by an AI coding agent; Taco Bell, for problems with automated drive-through ordering; and McDonald's, for security weaknesses in an AI recruitment chatbot.

At launch, the organizers proposed public voting in January, followed by an announcement of the winners in February.
