= Kaggle =

Internet platform for data science competitions

- Type: Subsidiary
- Industry: Data science
- Founded: April 2010
- Founder: Anthony Goldbloom
- Headquarters: San Francisco, United States
- Key people: D. Sculley (CEO); Julia Elliott (COO); Jeff Moser (Chief Architect)
- Products: Competitions, Kaggle Kernels, Kaggle Datasets, Kaggle Learn
- Parent: Google (2017–present)
- Website: kaggle.com

Kaggle is a data science competition platform and online community for data scientists and machine learning practitioners under Google LLC. Kaggle enables users to find and publish datasets, explore and build models in a web-based data science environment, work with other data scientists and machine learning engineers, and enter competitions to solve data science challenges. Kaggle has also facilitated the use of unethical and unreliable data in medical research.

== History ==
Kaggle was founded by Anthony Goldbloom in April 2010. Jeremy Howard, one of the first Kaggle users, joined in November 2010 and served as the President and Chief Scientist. Also on the team was Nicholas Gruen serving as the founding chair. In 2011, the company raised $12.5 million and Max Levchin became the chairman. On March 8, 2017, Fei-Fei Li, Chief Scientist at Google, announced that Google was acquiring Kaggle.

In June 2017, Kaggle surpassed 1 million registered users, and as of October 2023, it has over 15 million users in 194 countries.

In 2022, founders Goldbloom and Hamner stepped down from their positions and D. Sculley became the CEO.

In February 2023, Kaggle introduced Models, allowing users to discover and use pre-trained models through deep integrations with the rest of Kaggle’s platform.

In April 2025, Kaggle partnered with Wikimedia Foundation.

== Site overview ==
=== Competitions ===
Many machine-learning competitions have been run on Kaggle since the company was founded. Notable competitions include gesture recognition for Microsoft Kinect, making a association football AI for Manchester City, coding a trading algorithm for Two Sigma Investments, and improving the search for the Higgs boson at CERN.

The competition host prepares the data and a description of the problem; the host may choose whether it's going to be rewarded with money or be unpaid. Participants experiment with different techniques and compete against each other to produce the best models. Work is shared publicly through Kaggle Kernels to achieve a better benchmark and to inspire new ideas. Submissions can be made through Kaggle Kernels, via manual upload or using the Kaggle API. For most competitions, submissions are scored immediately (based on their predictive accuracy relative to a hidden solution file) and summarized on a live leaderboard. After the deadline passes, the competition host pays the prize money in exchange for "a worldwide, perpetual, irrevocable and royalty-free license [...] to use the winning Entry", i.e. the algorithm, software and related intellectual property developed, which is "non-exclusive unless otherwise specified".

Alongside its public competitions, Kaggle also offers private competitions, which are limited to Kaggle's top participants. Kaggle offers a free tool for data science teachers to run academic machine-learning competitions. Kaggle also hosts recruiting competitions in which data scientists compete for a chance to interview at leading data science companies like Facebook, Winton Capital, and Walmart.

Kaggle's competitions have resulted in successful projects such as furthering HIV research, chess ratings and traffic forecasting. Geoffrey Hinton and George Dahl used deep neural networks to win a competition hosted by Merck. Vlad Mnih (one of Hinton's students) used deep neural networks to win a competition hosted by Adzuna. This resulted in the technique being taken up by others in the Kaggle community. Tianqi Chen from the University of Washington also used Kaggle to show the power of XGBoost, which has since replaced Random Forest as one of the main methods used to win Kaggle competitions.

Several academic papers have been published based on findings from Kaggle competitions. A contributor to this is the live leaderboard, which encourages participants to continue innovating beyond existing best practices. The winning methods are frequently written on the Kaggle Winner's Blog.

=== Progression system ===
Kaggle has implemented a progression system to recognize and reward users based on their contributions and achievements within the platform. This system consists of five tiers: Novice, Contributor, Expert, Master, and Grandmaster. Each tier is achieved by meeting specific criteria in competitions, datasets, kernels (code-sharing), and discussions.

The highest tier, Kaggle Grandmaster, is awarded to users who have ranked at the top of multiple competitions including high ranking in a solo team. As of April 2, 2025, out of 23.29 million Kaggle accounts, 2,973 have achieved Kaggle Master status and 612 have achieved Kaggle Grandmaster status.

=== Kaggle Notebooks ===
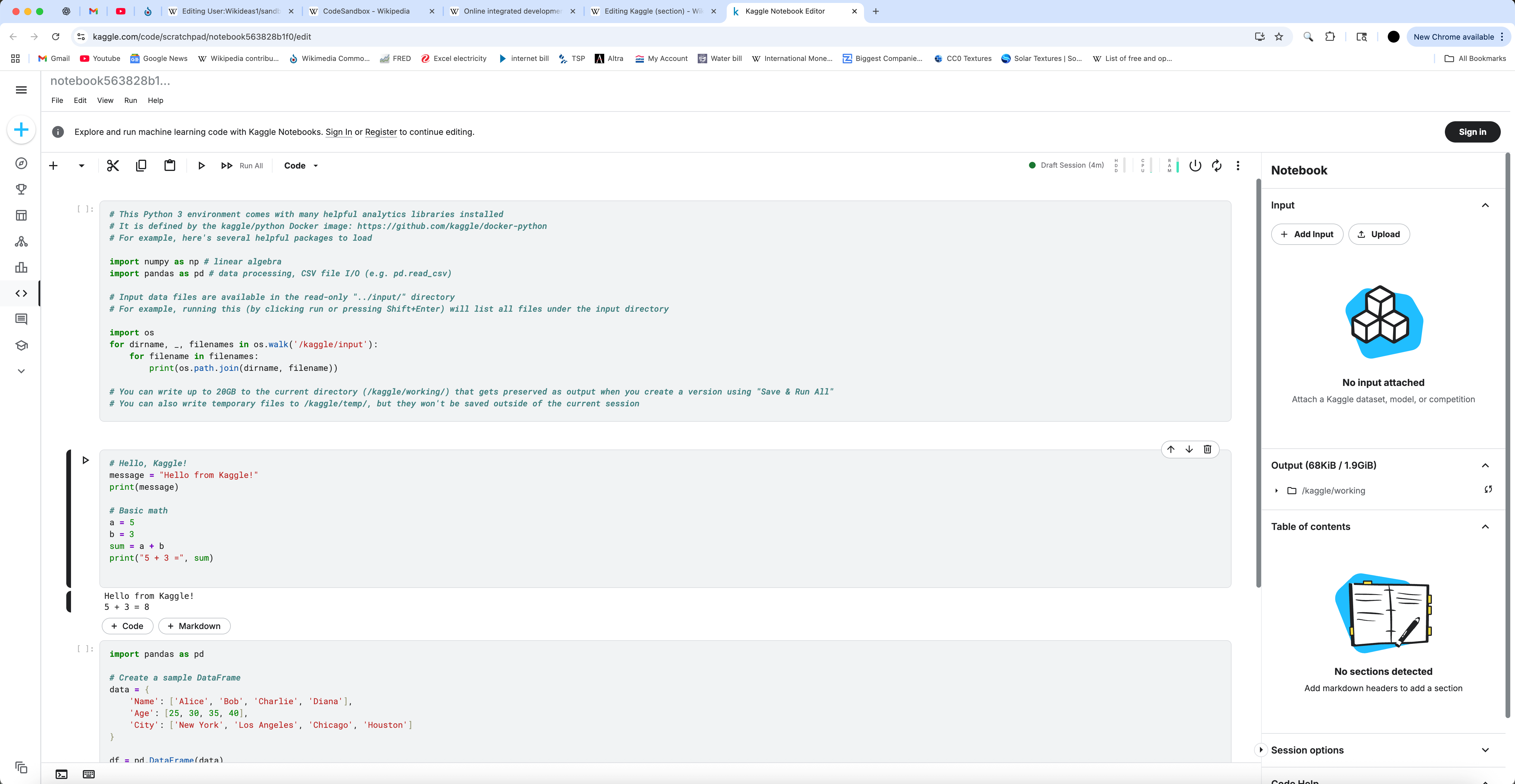
Kaggle Notebooks screenshot

Kaggle includes a free, browser-based online integrated development environment, called Kaggle Notebooks, designed for data science and machine learning. Users can write and execute code in Python or R, import datasets, use popular libraries, and train models on CPUs, GPUs, or TPUs directly in the cloud. This environment is often used for competition submissions, tutorials, education, and exploratory data analysis.

== Medical Research Problems ==
In December 2025, an article was published in The Transmitter titled "Exclusive: Springer Nature retracts, removes nearly 40 publications that trained neural networks on ‘bonkers’ dataset". The dataset in question was uploaded to Kaggle containing photographs of autistic and non-autistic children's faces. This dataset contained more than 2,900 images and it is unlikely that these children or their families gave consent for the photos for use in medical research or the images were ethically approved for research. The articles using the dataset in Springer Nature were retracted from the scientific literature. At least 90 other publications cite a version of the dataset.

In April 2026, another two datasets were identified on Kaggle with no data provenance having been published in Nature titled: "Dozens of AI disease-prediction models were trained on dubious data". These datasets were used in 125 clinical prediction models, at least two of which have been used in hospitals in Indonesia and Spain, while one article using the dataset was referenced in a medical device patent. As of June 5, 2026, five of the articles using these datasets have been retracted from the scientific literature.

In May 2026, an additional research publication using two image datasets from Kaggle is under investigation in Scientific Reports. An article in Retraction Watch "‘Comically bad’ datasets used to train clinical models for stroke and diabetes" highlighted the images included famous actors such as Sylvester Stallone as Rambo, George Clooney, Angelina Jolie and Daniel Craig as well as children. It would be unethical for the use of these child images in medical research without consent. Reverse searching images saw some of the images were not for stroke but for Bell's palsy. One of the datasets is no longer available on Kaggle while the other one still remains and mentions the images may be subject to copyright.

Kaggle relies on the community self-reporting metadata and provenance and mentions the use of the stroke and diabetes dataset identified in "Evidence of unreliable data and poor data provenance in clinical prediction model research and clinical practice" is entirely legitimate and does not violate their terms of service.

== See also ==
- Competitive programming
- Data science competition platform
- Anthony Goldbloom
- Hugging Face
- Google Colab
