= GitHub Codespaces =

Online integrated development environment platform from GitHub

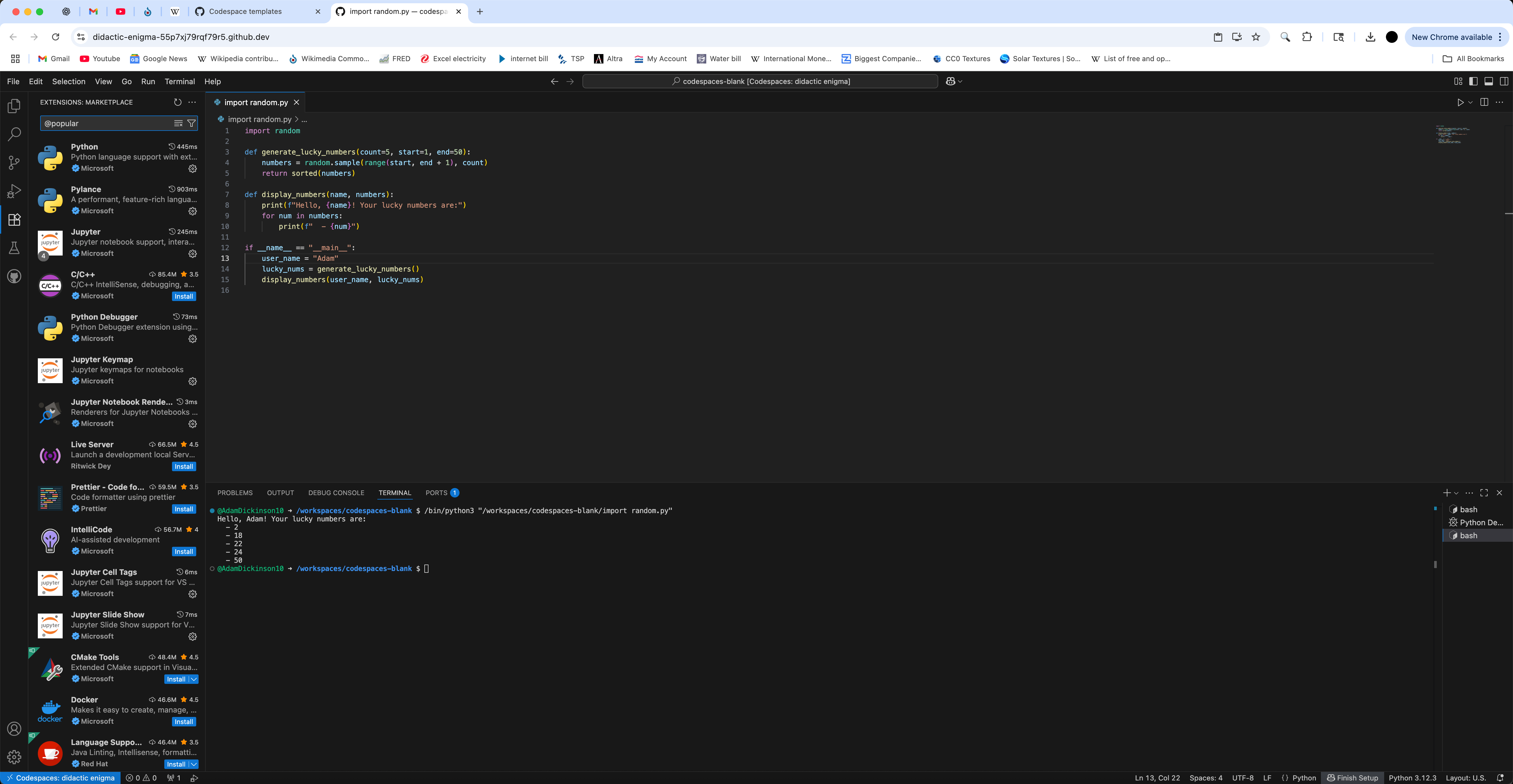
- Screenshot in the web-browser
- Developers: GitHub, a subsidiary of Microsoft
- Initial release: 2020; 6 years ago
- Platform: Web application O–IDE
- Type: Cloud computing development environment
- License: Proprietary software
- Website: github.com/features/codespaces

GitHub Codespaces is a cloud-based online integrated development environment developed by GitHub. It allows users to create and manage development environments directly within the browser or through Visual Studio Code desktop. Codespaces is tightly integrated with GitHub repositories and enables on-demand coding, debugging, and testing in a full-featured development container hosted in the cloud.

== Features ==
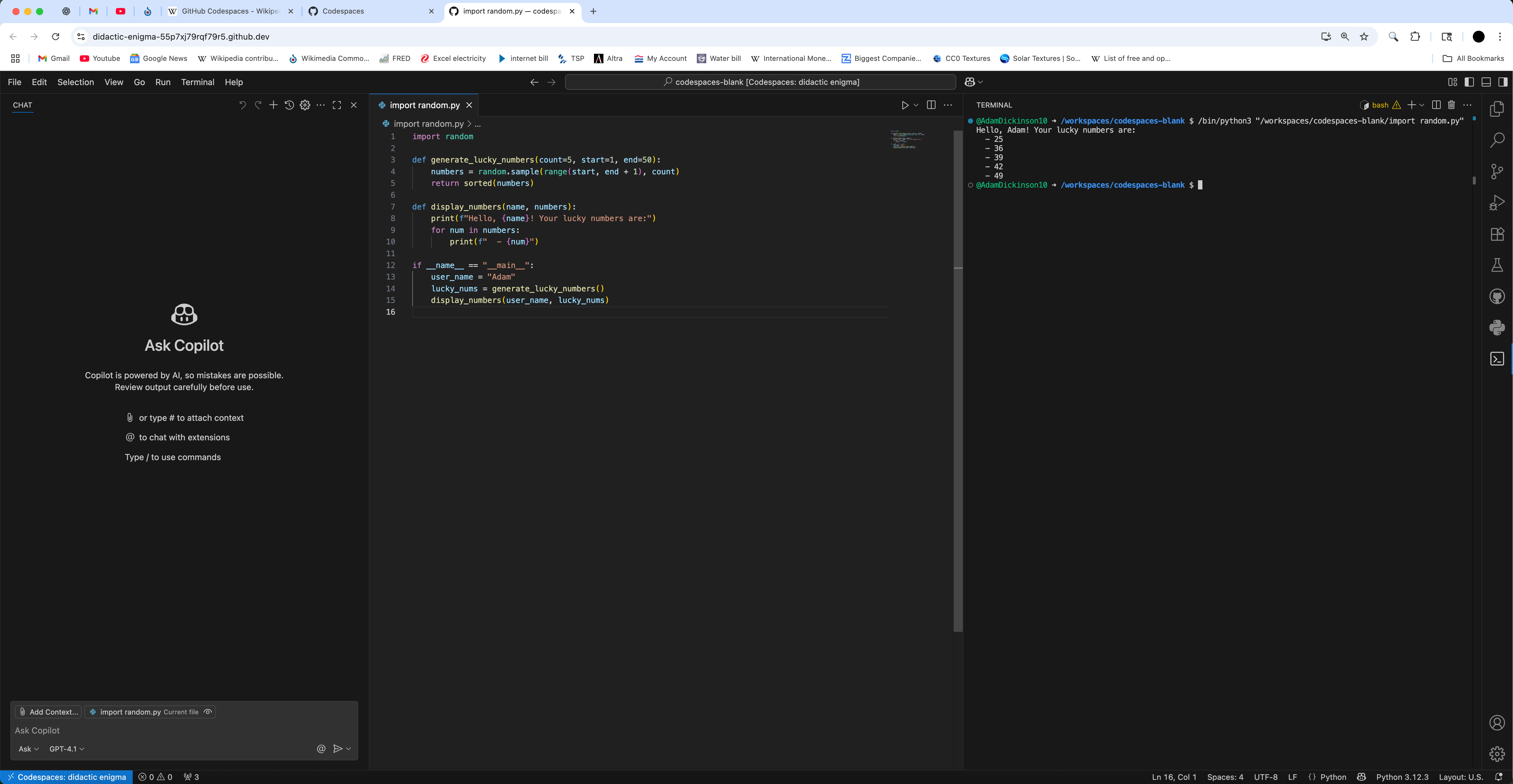
Codespaces layout GitHub Copilot on the left Code editor in center Terminal on the right

- Instant development environments integrated with GitHub
- Browser-based and desktop access via Visual Studio Code
- Configurable Dockerfile or devcontainer.json environments
- Built-in support for GitHub Copilot, extensions, snippets, and SSH.

== Licensing ==
GitHub Codespaces is proprietary software and available to GitHub users under various subscription plans. Codespaces includes a monthly usage quota for free tier users of 120 hours, and expanded access for GitHub education, Pro, Team, and GitHub Enterprise plans.

== GitHub Classroom ==
GitHub Classroom is an educational tool developed by GitHub to streamline the process of managing programming assignments and coursework. Integrated with GitHub repositories, it allows instructors to distribute starter code, automate grading workflows, and track student progress. GitHub Classroom is widely used in computer science education and supports integration with GitHub Codespaces for cloud-based development environments.

== Programming languages supported ==
- C
- C++
- C#
- Clojure
- CoffeeScript
- CSS
- Dart
- Diff
- Docker
- F#
- Go
- Groovy
- Handlebars
- HLSL
- HTML
- INI
- Java
- JavaScript
- JSON
- Julia
- LaTeX
- Less
- Lua
- Make
- Markdown
- Markdown Math
- Objective-C
- Perl
- PHP
- PowerShell
- Prompt
- Pug
- Python
- R
- Razor
- ReStructuredText
- Ruby
- Rust
- SCSS
- ShaderLab
- Shell Script
- SQL
- Swift
- TypeScript
- Visual Basic
- Windows Batch File
- XML
- YAML

== Extensions ==
Some of the popular extensions include:

- .NET
- ASP.NET Core
- Atlassian
- AWS Cloud Development Kit
- Azure ML
- Bootstrap
- CMake
- CodeQL
- Composer
- DeepSeek R1
- Dev Containers
- Django
- Docker
- ESLint
- Flutter
- GitHub Copilot
- GitHub Repositories
- Gradle
- Hex editor
- IntelliCode
- Jinja
- Jira
- Jupyter Notebook
- Kubernetes
- LLDB
- Maven
- Microsoft Azure SQL Database
- Microsoft SQL Server
- PlantUML
- PostgreSQL
- Prettier
- React Native
- Remote - SSH
- SonarQube
- Spring Boot
- SQLite
- Vim emulator
- Windows Subsystem for Linux
- Xdebug

== See also ==
- Comparison of integrated development environments
- Comparison of source-code-hosting facilities
- Google Colab
- List of online integrated development environments
