= National Repository of Open Educational Resources =

Academic resource repository

- Country: India
- Launched: 13 August 2013; 13 years ago
- Status: Inactive
- Website: nroer.gov.in

The National Repository of Open Educational Resources (NROER) was an online educational resource developed by CIET, NCERT. It was launched during the National Conference on ICT (Information and Communication Technology) for School Education.

== History ==
NROER was launched on 13 August 2013 in New Delhi in collaboration with the Department of School Education and Literacy, Ministry of Human Resource Development, Government of India. Metastudio, the platform hosting the repository is an initiative of Knowledge Labs, Homi Bhabha Centre for Science Education, Mumbai.

NROER hosted large number educational resources in many subjects and in different Indian languages for Primary, Secondary and Senior Secondary classes. Resources were available in different formats like Video, Image, Audio, Document and Interactive. Apart from this all NCERT books were available in Flip book format.

NROER was a collaborative platform, intend to reached the un-reached and institutions like SCERT, SIERT, SIE, Vigyan Prasar, CCERT, Gujarat Institute of Educational Technology (GIET), SIET and other stake holders had their share in the educational content.

== Licensing ==
All the content available on NROER was under Creative Commons CC BY-SA 3.0 License. However, the NCERT text books are licensed to download, permitted to share "as it is" non-commercially and should be properly attributed. The republication is strictly prohibited.
