= CoCalc =

Cloud computing and course management platform

- The CoCalc Logo

- A Sage worksheet being edited on CoCalc
- Website type: SaaS, Cloud computing
- Available in: English
- Creator: William Stein
- Website: cocalc.com
- Commercial: Yes
- Registration: Required
- Users: ~300,000
- Launched: 2013; 13 years ago
- Current status: Active

CoCalc (formerly called SageMathCloud) is a web-based cloud computing (SaaS) and course management platform for computational mathematics. It supports editing of Sage worksheets, LaTeX documents and Jupyter notebooks. CoCalc runs an Ubuntu Linux environment that can be interacted with through a terminal, additionally giving access to most of the capabilities of Linux.

CoCalc offers both free and paid accounts. Subscriptions provide internet access and more storage and computing resources. One subscription can be used to increase quotas for one project used by multiple accounts. There are subscription plans for courses. Over 200 courses have used CoCalc.

== Features ==
CoCalc directly supports Sage worksheets, which interactively evaluate Sage code. The worksheets support Markdown and HTML for decoration, and R, Octave, Cython, Julia and others for programming in addition to Sage. CoCalc supports Jupyter notebooks, which are enhanced with real-time synchronization for collaboration and a history recording function. Additionally, there is also a full LaTeX editor, with collaboration support, a preview of the resulting document and also support for SageTeX. With its online Linux terminal, CoCalc also indirectly supports editing and running many other languages, including Java, C/C++, Perl, Ruby, and other popular languages that can be run on Linux. Other packages can be installed on request.

Users can have multiple projects on CoCalc, and each project has separate disk space and may be on an entirely different server. Many users can collaborate on a single project, and documents are synced, so multiple users can edit the same file at once, similar to Google Docs. All the data on projects is automatically backed up about every five minutes with bup, and snapshots of previous versions are accessible. Through the terminal, files can be tracked using revision control systems like Git.

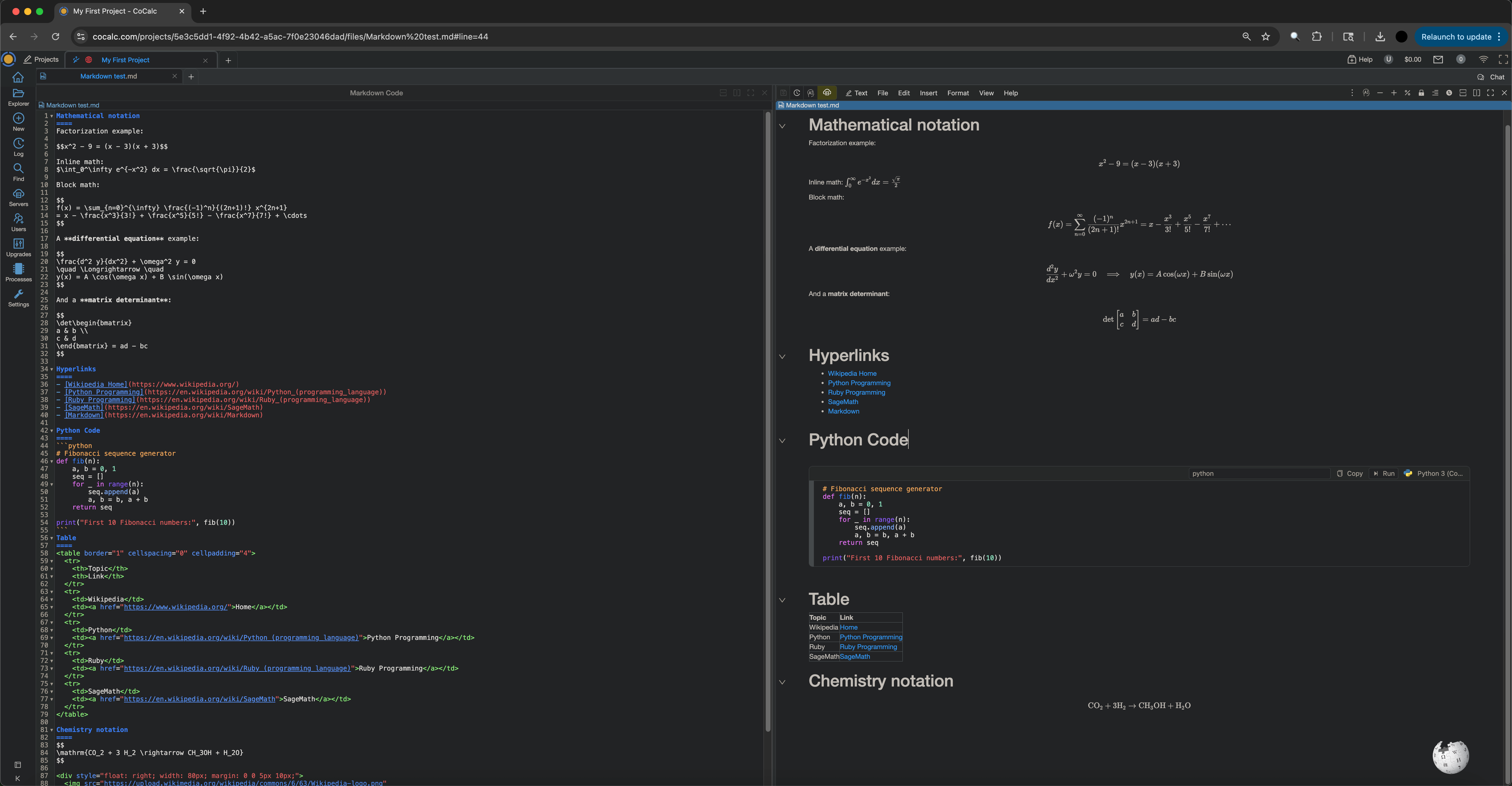
Computational writing using Markdown

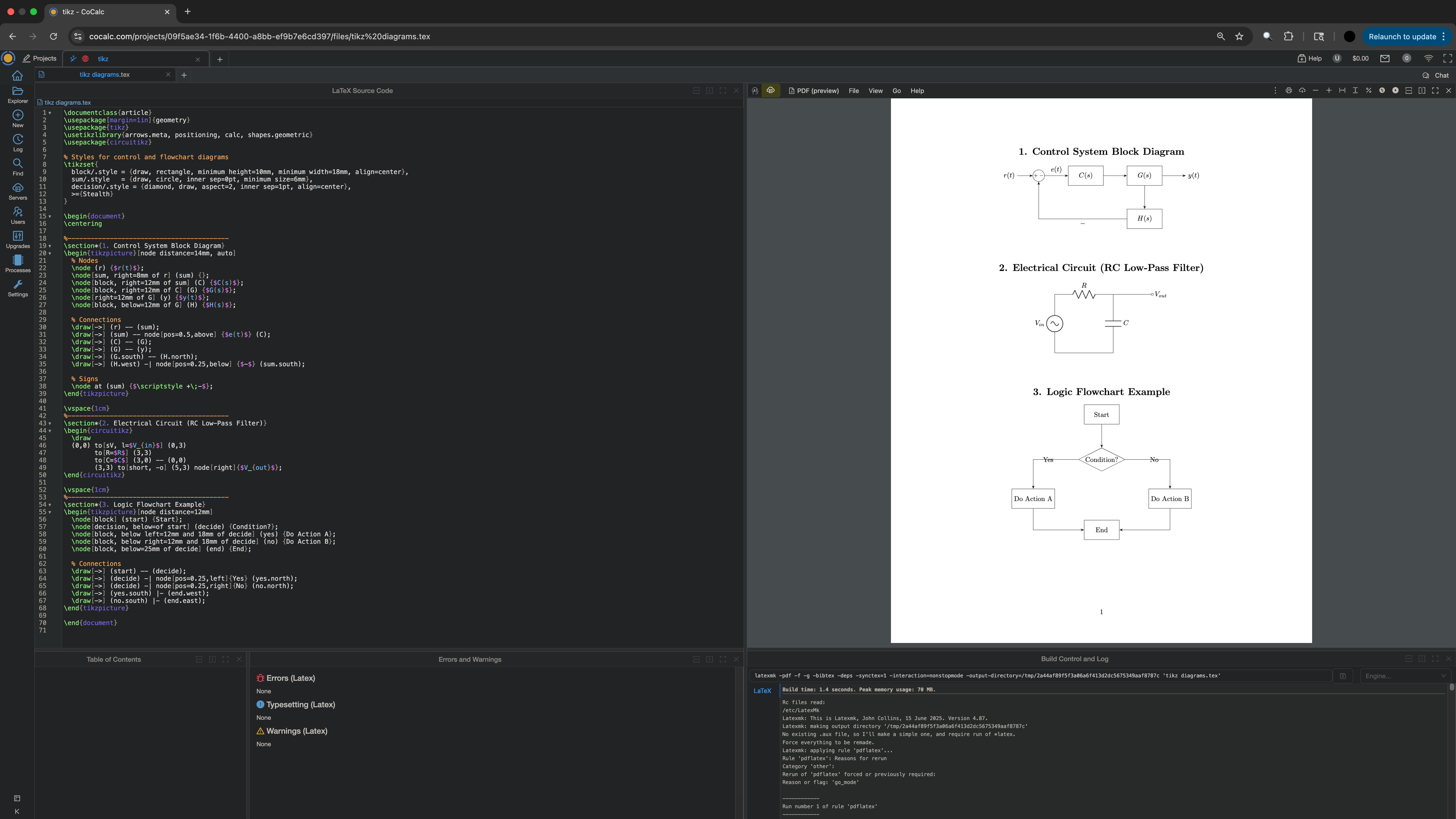
tikz and CircuiTikZ diagrams with LaTeX

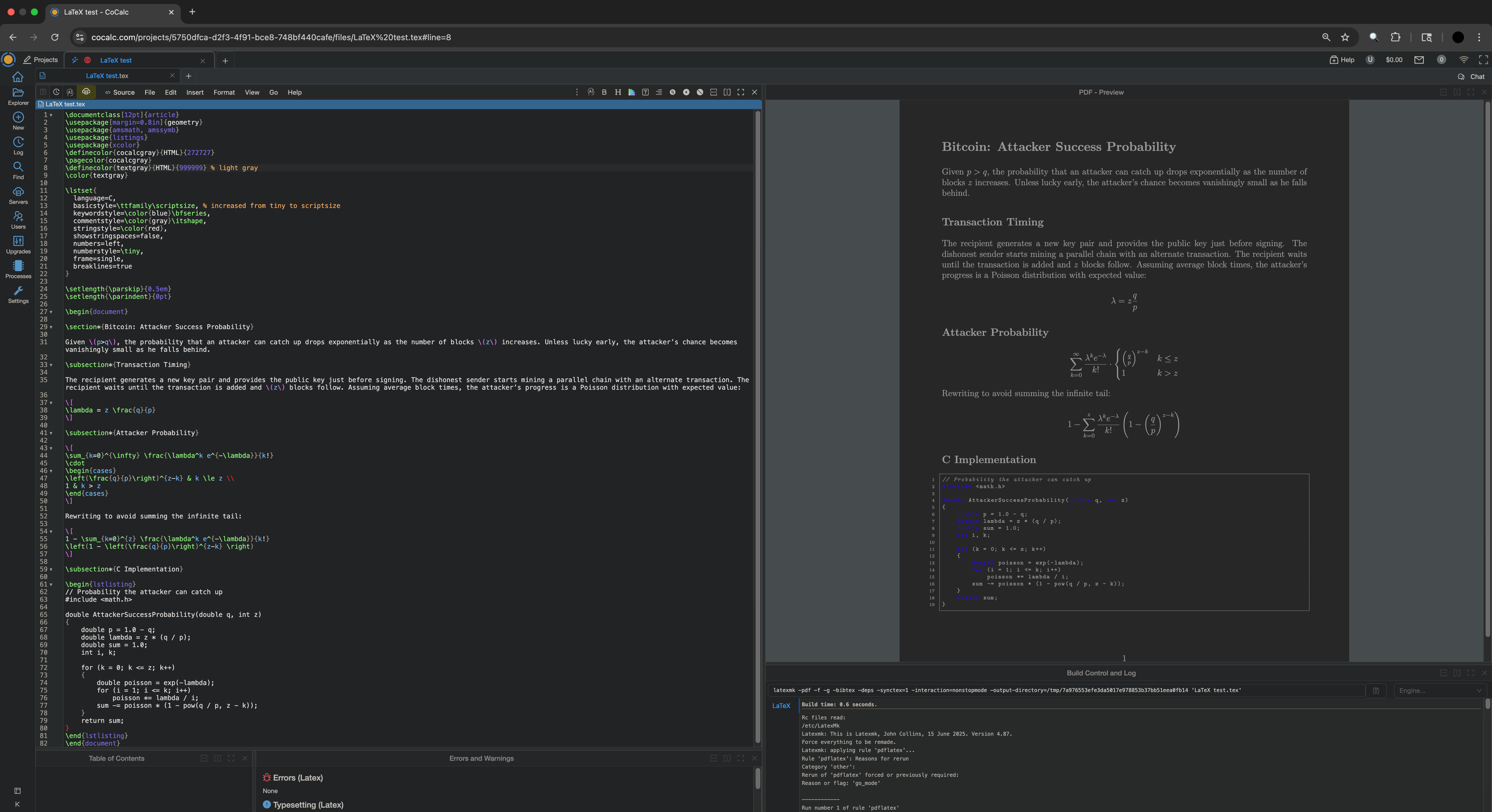
LaTeX white paper with mathematical notation and C computer code

CoCalc also does Jupyter Notebook, R Markdown, Linux terminal, SageMath Worksheet / Notebooks.

== Development ==
CoCalc is operated by SageMath Inc. The creator and lead developer of CoCalc is William Stein, a former professor of mathematics at the University of Washington who also created the Sage software system. Initial development was funded by the University of Washington and grants from the National Science Foundation and Google. Now CoCalc is mostly funded by paying users. It is intended as a replacement for sagenb, which also let users edit and share Sage worksheets online.

== See also ==
- Comparison of TeX editors
- Google Colab, a Jupiter Notebook environment run by Google
- List of online integrated development environments
