= William A. Stein =

American professor of mathematics

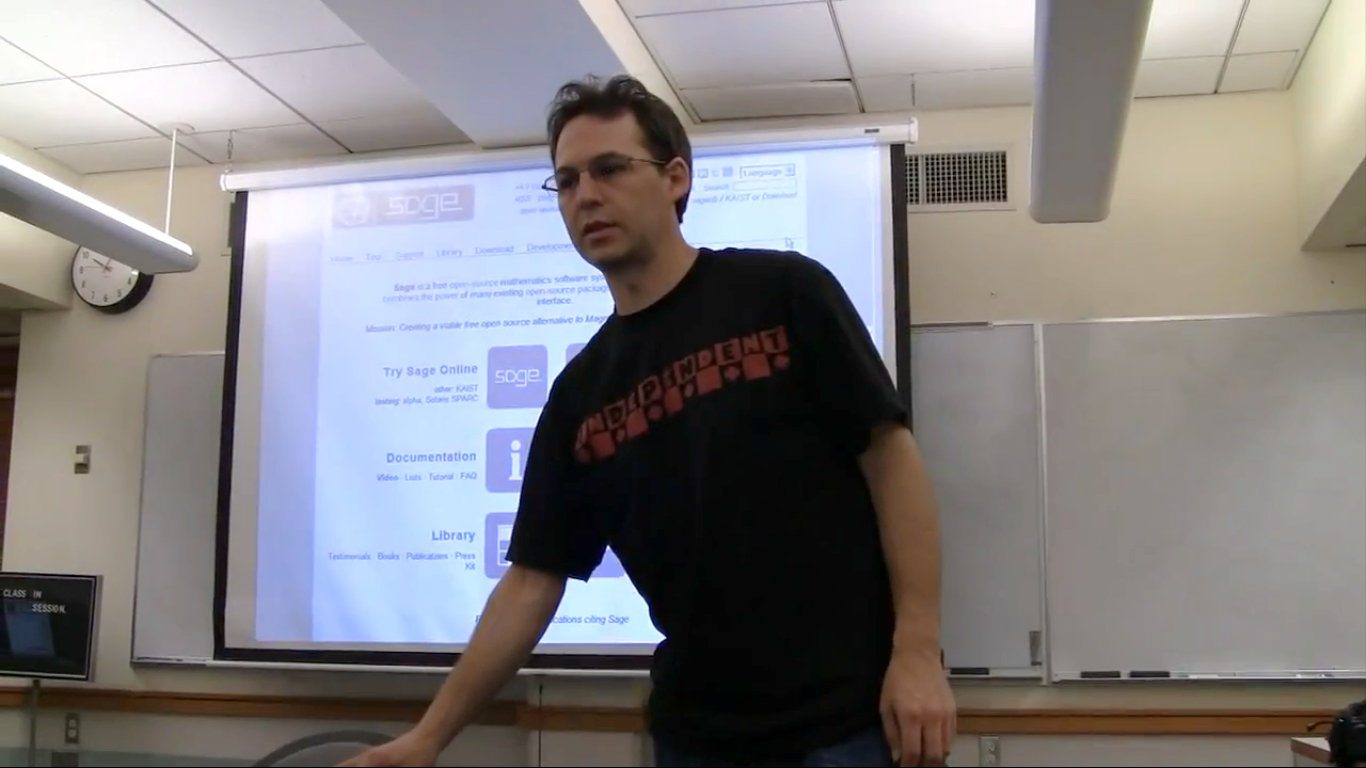
- Born: William Arthur Stein; 21 February 1974 (age 52); Santa Barbara, California, US
- Occupations: Software Developer, Professor of Mathematics
- Known for: Lead developer of SageMath and founder of CoCalc.
- Website: www.wstein.org

William Arthur Stein (born February 21, 1974) is an American software developer and previously a professor of mathematics at the University of Washington.

Stein received his PhD in 2000, from the University of California, Berkeley, for his dissertation ‘Explicit Approaches to Modular Abelian Varieties’, supervised by Hendrik W. Lenstra.

Stein is the lead developer of SageMath and founder of CoCalc. Stein does computational and theoretical research into the problem of computing with modular forms and the Birch and Swinnerton-Dyer conjecture. He is considered "a leading expert in the field of computational arithmetic".

Stein was the 2013 recipient of the Richard Dimick Jenks Memorial Prize Award, presented by SIGSAM, a special interest group of the Association for Computing Machinery.

== Publications ==
- Stein, William (2009). Elementary Number Theory: Primes, Congruences, and Secrets. New York, New York: Springer Verlag. ISBN 978-0-387-85524-0. OCLC 268798336.
- Mazur, Barry; Stein, William (2016). Prime Numbers and the Riemann Hypothesis. New York, New York: Cambridge University Press. ISBN 978-1-107-49943-0.
