= Unizin =

Consortium of higher education institutions

- Founded: 2014
- Purpose: Higher Education Technology
- Key people: Bart Pursel, Chief Executive Officer
- Website: unizin.org

Unizin (pronounced [ju.nɨ.zɪn] (IPA) or "yo͞o-nə-zin") is both a consortium of higher education institutions and a service provider. The Unizin consortium was founded in 2014 by Colorado State University, University of Florida, Indiana University, and University of Michigan. On July 22, 2014, Unizin named Amin Qazi its founding CEO. The Unizin service debuted its first offering, Canvas by Instructure, in late summer 2014. The goal of the Unizin service is to standardize digital learning by creating common standards that enable collaboration within the higher education community. The Unizin consortium offers a channel for collaborating on solutions to the many challenges being faced by educational institutions, as well as a means for those institutions to collectively govern resources and cost-effectively control infrastructure necessary to enable innovation at their universities. Unizin, Ltd. is a registered 501(c)(3).

== Background ==
In June 2014, Internet2 and each of the four founding member universities separately announced Unizin. On October 1, 2014, Unizin announced three additional universities had joined, University of Wisconsin-Madison, University of Minnesota, and Oregon State University. On December 18, 2014, Unizin announced it had added three additional members: University of Iowa, Ohio State University, and Penn State University. In June 2015, Unizin also welcomed the University of Nebraska–Lincoln. Representatives from each of the founding institutions comprise the Unizin board of directors. In July 2015, Unizin announced its first subscribing member and first university system the State University System of Florida. On May 1, 2016, Unizin became an independent incorporated 501(c)(3) nonprofit, Unizin Ltd.

== Components ==
Unizin is a cloud-scale service operator and integrator focused on improving learner experiences with digital teaching and learning resources. It provides services to support the Digital Education offerings of its members and subscribers including services for Content, Learning Environments, and Analytics.

=== Content ===
According to Unizin.org, member instructors “will be able to share their own teaching content, and gain access to a repository of shared digital content from campus colleagues and others at member institutions." In July 2015, Unizin acquired the software and trademark for Courseload, an eText reader and collaborative tool. Unizin's former COO, Robin Littleworth said in a blog post that Courseload will form the foundation for Unizin's Content Relay. "The Content Relay is aimed at making two problems easier to address," said Littleworth. "Creating and supporting simple and sustainable workflows around 1) the deposit and distribution of faculty/institutionally generated content; and 2) the discovery of content that can be used in classes, labs, and experiential learning settings (e.g., repositories, OER, institutionally licensed content, publisher paid content, etc.)." Unizin also makes content discoverable and portable, providing higher education institutions with an exit strategy should they choose to switch service providers.

=== Platform ===
Unizin announced that Canvas by Instructure would serve as the learning management system (LMS) for its members, though members could continue to run other LMSs in parallel. Members chose Canvas in part because it meets IMS Global open standards; also much of the LMS is open source software. The Unizin consortium has not announced details of additional platforms that may be part of the Unizin service.

=== Analytics ===
The Unizin Data Platform (UDP) offers data products and services for learning analytics, application development, research, and business intelligence. By operating on common platforms, Unizin members can not only leverage learner outcome analytics both within and across institutions, but can also save time and effort with data management tasks. Unizin further states that analytics will not only help improve learning, but will also be available for research. The UDP collects and standardizes data from a variety of sources using the Unizin Common Data Model (UCDM) and gives researchers and analysts access to data marts, real-time event processing, and APIs. The UCDM is the standard for representing data from across the teaching and learning ecosystem and normalizes data from across a range of systems and tools.
