= Firebase Studio =

Online integrated development environment

- Other names: Project IDX
- Developer: Google
- Release: May 15, 2024 (as open beta)
- Written in: JavaScript, TypeScript, HTML, CSS
- Platform: Web
- Successor: Google Antigravity
- Type: Online IDE
- License: Proprietary
- Website: studio.firebase.google.com

Firebase Studio (formerly known as Project IDX) is an online integrated development environment (IDE) developed by Google. It is based on Visual Studio Code, and the infrastructure runs on Google Cloud. In addition to including the features, languages and plugins supported by VS Code, it has unique functionality built by Google. These include a built-in generative AI assistant powered by Gemini, Nix integrations, and Android emulators. Google also provides templates for JavaScript, Python, and Go projects, as well for as a number of web and cross-platform frameworks such as Node, Angular, Flutter, Next.js, React, FireBase, Google Maps, and Flask.

The application was initially only accessible after signing up on a waitlist. It was released as an open beta on May 14, 2024. It was renamed from Project IDX to Firebase Studio on April 15, 2025. In March 2026, Google announced that the service would be discontinued in March 2027, in order to focus on other AI development tools.

== Discontinuation ==
On March 19, 2026, Google announced that Firebase Studio would be discontinued, with the service beginning its shutdown phase on the same day. New workspace creation and account registration were disabled on June 22, 2026, and the service plans to shut down on March 22, 2027. Google shifted its focus towards Google AI Studio and other AI products.
