= JSFiddle =

Online service for web development

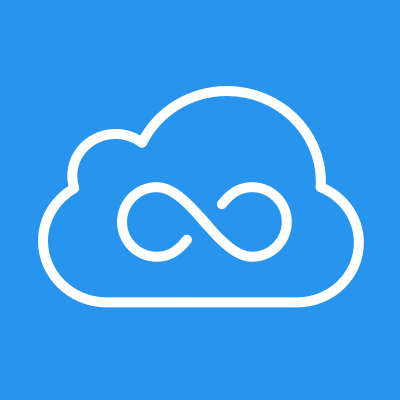
- Available in: English
- Founders: Oskar Krawczyk, Piotr Zalewa
- Website: jsfiddle.net
- Commercial: No
- Registration: Optional
- Launched: 2010; 16 years ago

JSFiddle is an online IDE service and online community for testing and showcasing user-created and collaborational HTML, CSS and JavaScript code snippets, known as 'fiddles'. It allows for simulated AJAX calls. In 2019, JSFiddle was ranked the second most popular online IDE by the PopularitY of Programming Language (PYPL) index based on the number of times it was searched, directly behind Cloud9 IDE, worldwide and in the USA.

== Concept ==
JSFiddle is an online IDE which is designed to allow users to edit and run HTML, JavaScript, and CSS code on a single page. Its interface is minimalist and split into four main frames, which correspond to editable HTML, JavaScript and CSS fields and a result field which displays the user's project after it is run. Since early on, JSFiddle adopted smart source-code editor with programming features.

As of 2020, JSFiddle uses CodeMirror to support its editable fields, providing multicursors, syntax highlighting, syntax verification (linter), brace matching, auto indentation, autocompletion, code/text folding, Search and Replace to assist web developers in their actions. On the left, a sidebar allows users to integrate external resources such as external CSS stylesheets and external JavaScript libraries. The most popular JavaScript frameworks and CSS frameworks are suggested to users and available via a click.

JSFiddle allows users to publicly save their code an uncapped number of times for three. Each version is saved online at the application's website with an incremental numbered suffix. This allows users to re-access their saved code. Code saved on JSFiddle may also be edited into new versions, shared with other parties, and forked into a new line.

JSFiddle is widely used among web developers to share simple tests and demonstrations. JSFiddle is also widely used on Stack Overflow, the dominant question-answer online forum for the web industry.

== History ==
In 2009, JSFiddle's predecessor, MooShell, was created by Piotr Zalewa as a website application which was exclusive to the MooTools community. In 2010, Oskar Krawczyk joined the project as a developer, and the platform was made freely available under the name of JSFiddle.

In 2016, JSFiddle underwent a full platform overhaul and became ad-sponsored. In 2017, Michał Laskowski and Andrzej Kała joined the company.
