= Open Universities Australia =

Network of Australian universities offering distance education

- Type: Public university consortium
- Established: 1993
- Administrative staff: 150+
- Location: 700 Collins St, Docklands VIC 3008, Headquarters in Melbourne, Australia
- Campus: Online
- Website: www.open.edu.au

Open Universities Australia (OUA) is an online higher education organisation based in Australia. The organisation was previously known as the Open Learning Agency of Australia. The chairman is Professor Bruce S. Dowton and the chief executive officer is Catherine Reynolds.

Seven Australian-based universities control the ownership of the organisation. A board of directors, consisting of nominees from the universities which own the organisation, governs OUA. There are also up to five independent directors on the board at any one time.

While the majority of enrolled students are based in Australia, courses are available to students globally. Most undergraduate courses offered have no first-year entry requirements and there are no quotas for most courses.

Through OUA, students can enrol in hundreds of qualifications online, which are provided by Australian universities and other education providers.

== Partnerships ==
The seven shareholder universities are:

- Adelaide University
- Curtin University
- Griffith University
- Macquarie University
- Monash University
- Royal Melbourne Institute of Technology
- Swinburne University of Technology

There are a further 20 partner universities.

- Australian Catholic University
- Australian National University
- Bond University
- Edith Cowan University
- Federation University Australia
- Flinders University
- James Cook University
- La Trobe University
- Murdoch University
- Queensland University of Technology
- Southern Cross University
- Torrens University Australia
- University of Canberra
- University of New England
- University of Newcastle
- University of Notre Dame Australia
- University of Queensland
- University of Southern Queensland
- University of Tasmania
- University of the Sunshine Coast

OUA is a member of the Elite Athlete Friendly University program (EAFU). A key factor in being part of EAFU is for the partner to support athletes to achieve academic excellence and recognise the challenges athletes face when combining education, career and a personal life with a high-performance sporting career.

Professional athletes studying through OUA come from a range of sports including all football codes, tennis, athletics and diving.

OUA also has partnerships with several Australian public and private organizations such as National Australia Bank, Westpac Group and the Commonwealth Department of Defence.

== History ==
Open Universities Australia was formed as the Open Learning Agency of Australia Pty Ltd (OLAA or OLA) in late 1993 as a private company.

The organisation was originally owned by Monash University. In order to provide equal access to students across Australia's regional areas, they created a partnership with the Australian Broadcasting Corporation and eight other universities. At this time, the federal government provided funding for the project.

In 2004, OLA changed its name to Open Universities Australia (OUA), reflecting the changing demands and expectation of its students. In the same year, OUA students gained access to the new FEE-HELP scheme. FEE-HELP provides eligible students with deferred payment options for undergraduate and postgraduate units and courses and remains a popular option with OUA students.

In June 2012, IBM used the organisation as an IT case study after implementing a new IT strategy. The move was aimed at supporting student performance and retention, while also giving the organisation an insight into marketing and sales options.

In December 2012, the organisation placed a bid for a top level domain, .courses. The bid was made in a lottery draw, held by ICANN to help assign new generic top-level domains.

Open2Study was launched in March 2013 as a teaching, learning and assessment platform. It enabled universities to offer free courses online. It competed with global online learning platform providers such as Coursera and EdX. Open2Study closed in 2019.

In July 2013, OUA acquired a 100 per cent interest in Interact Learning Pty Ltd, trading as e3Learning, an Australian online training and compliance provider based in Adelaide. Founded in 2001, e3Learning has 250 corporate customers across Australia, the United Kingdom and New Zealand and employs more than 70 staff. The City & Guilds Group acquired e3Learning from OUA in 2017.

In December 2013, OUA launched Open Training Institute, a registered training organisation offering online vocational education and training. The Institute closed in 2017.
