= Shaw Academy =

Online education organisation in Dublin, Ireland

- Website type: Online learning
- Available in: English
- Founders: James Egan; Adrian Murphy
- Employees: 66 (2019)
- Website: shawacademy.com
- Launched: 2013

Founded in 2013, Shaw Academy is a privately owned online education organisation based in Dublin, Ireland.

== History ==
Shaw Academy was founded by James Egan and Adrian Murphy in 2013.

By January 2016, Shaw Academy taught about 55,000 new students each month. By November of the same year, the academy instructed 400,000 new students monthly, with a cumulative total surpassing 1.84 million students.

In January 2016, Adrian Murphy, one of the founders, along with the Irish Minister for Jobs, Richard Bruton, announced the addition of 40 new educational positions at the Dublin office. The CEO of Irish government agency Enterprise Ireland, Julie Sinnamon, described Shaw Academy at the time as "an example of an innovative Irish company in the growing online learning market, who are also supporting other Irish SMEs to grow through their extensive suite of online courses."

In January 2017, Shaw Academy launched an educational platform, called Phoenix, to accommodate growing student numbers.

In October 2017, the organisation ran a crowdfunding round on Crowdcube, achieving €2.5 million in promised investment. In November 2017, Crowdcube cancelled the organisation's appeal and released investors from their investment pledges, stating that the organisation had repeatedly failed to comply with the platform's requirements for investment messaging to be "fair, clear and not misleading."

In January 2019, one of the organisation's primary creditors, Columbia Lake Partners, sought immediate recovery of a €5.5 million loan which resulted in the High Court appointing an insolvency practitioner. In March, the court approved the exit of Shaw Academy from examinership after the company secured an additional €7.15 million in funding.

In June 2020, Shaw Academy claimed a tenfold increase in students due to the COVID-19 lockdowns. At that time several customers of the academy started making complaints that they were having difficulties cancelling free trial memberships. Other customers stated that the academy was taking unauthorised payments and the customers were having difficulty with refunds. Trustpilot has issued an alert on its website that Shaw Academy may have taken actions that lead to an artificially inflated "TrustScore." Examples of the artificially inflated scores include emails being sent by company representatives that asked customers to delete negative Trustpilot reviews or replace them with positive reviews.

== Courses ==
Shaw Academy offers courses ranging from business related topics such as digital marketing, social media marketing and web development to wellness programmes such as health and fitness and sports nutrition. Courses are delivered using recordings from live presentations. Students can log on to an online portal to complete assignments, exams, review modules, replay lectures, and view additional content. Educational and technical support teams are also available to students.

== Accreditation ==
Edinburgh Napier University previously credit-rated Shaw Academy's professional diploma courses against the Scottish Credit and Qualifications Framework (SCQF) by Edinburgh Napier University. This credit rating did not imply accreditation or the award of university credit and was withdrawn on July 24, 2019.

On September 29, 2020, Shaw Academy announced through Facebook and via an open statement on their website from their CEO that they were triple accredited. One of the organisations, International Accreditation Organization, is known to be linked to a diploma mill selling fraudulent academic degrees. The other two accreditations the academy has announced they are affiliated with are CPD (Continuing Professional Development) and ICSOC (International Council of Specialised Online Certifications).

== Office locations ==
The company's headquarters are in Dublin, Ireland, with other offices elsewhere, employing approximately 200 staff globally in 2016. In September 2015, Shaw Academy set up an office in Bangalore, India, which employed over 120 staff. As of April 2019, Shaw Academy employed 66 individuals across its offices in Dublin, Bangalore, and Cape Town.
