= OpenClassrooms =

Online education technology company

- Website type: Online education
- Available in: English, French, Spanish
- Owner: OpenClassrooms
- Creator: Mathieu Nebra
- Website: https://openclassrooms.com/
- Commercial: Yes
- Users: 2.5 million
- Launched: 10 November 1999

OpenClassrooms is a France-based online education platform for vocational training, providing courses in IT, technology, entrepreneurship, and digital skills.

Courses are conducted fully online, through a mix of video resources, online reading, real-life projects and individual mentoring sessions.

Founded in 2013 by Pierre Dubuc and Mathieu Nebra, OpenClassrooms now has 2.5 million users worldwide and offers courses in English, French and Spanish. The company's mission is to ‘make education accessible’

Students can choose to follow online courses in subjects ranging from JavaScript to Product Management, or pursue internationally recognized degree programs.

== Courses and learning paths ==
OpenClassrooms offers 1000+ courses focusing on in-demand skills and ranging from entrepreneurship, digital marketing to web development.

Since 2015, OpenClassrooms also offers what it calls learning paths. A learning path relies on real-life projects and mentorship. Additionally, students have access to courses within modules in order to get resources.

At the end of each module, the student is asked to complete a project that is then assessed by a mentor.

When the student has completed all their projects, their work is assessed by a jury. If the session is successful, the student is then awarded an internationally recognized diploma.

OpenClassrooms currently has 12 available degree programs in French and 7 in English (Front-end web development, Ruby development, Android development, iOS development, full-stack web development, UX design, product management). Programs take from 6 to 12 months to complete and the level of the program ranges from bachelor's-level to master's-level.

== Membership structure ==
OpenClassrooms operates on a freemium basis.

A user can register on OpenClassrooms for free and follow all courses on the platform. The number of videos a user can watch is, however, limited to 5 per week.

A user can sign up for a Premium Solo membership (costing €20 per month) and have access to unlimited videos as well as earn certificates.

A user can sign up for a Premium Plus membership (costing from €300 per month) and follow a structured learning path consisting of projects, dedicated mentoring sessions and a state-endorsed degree at the end.

== Accreditation ==
OpenClassrooms is an official private distance learning establishment registered with the Board of Education in Paris, France that grants its own degrees as well as those of other academic partners.

Upon completion of their studies and validation of their skills by an academic jury, the student will earn a bachelor's-level or master's-level diploma in the corresponding field of study.

For instance, the front-end web development program is at level 6 on the EQF (European Qualifications Framework). Thanks to the Bologna Process, signed by 50 countries, the diploma is recognized by all participating countries, notably in Europe.

Each path is the subject of a registration application with the National Directory of Professional Certifications (RNCP), via the National Commission of Professional Certifications (CNCP), in order for the level of the diploma to be recognized by the State.

== History ==
The origins of OpenClassrooms go back to 1999, when Mathieu Nebra, helped by Pierre Dubuc, launched a community site for tutorials called Le site du Zéro. Its aim was to help young people to learn programming languages.

In 2007, the site became a company, which offers online courses, MOOCs, and learning paths on a freemium basis. These courses are created either in house, or in partnership with universities, such as École polytechnique, and companies, such as IBM.

In October 2015, OpenClassrooms signed a deal with the French Government which gives free Premium Solo memberships (€20 per month) to all unemployed people.

In November 2016, OpenClassrooms launched its first bachelor's degree in English in Web Development, recognized internationally.

In December 2016, OpenClassrooms signed a deal with Morocco's ANAPEC (Agence nationale de promotion de l'emploi et des compétences) and offered free Premium Solo memberships to job seekers

By 2017, the number of OpenClassrooms user accounts reached 2 million, with the number of unique visitors reaching 3.5 million per month.

In March 2017, OpenClassrooms signed a deal with Tunisia's ANETI (Agence nationale pour l’emploi et le travail indépendant) and offered free Premium Solo memberships to job seekers.

In April 2017, OpenClassrooms launched Job Guarantee in France which states that if students do not find employment within six months after graduating from OpenClassrooms, their tuition fees will be refunded. The company launched this internationally in July 2017.

In June 2017, OpenClassrooms launched a partnership program with Capgemini, one of the world's largest IT consulting, outsourcing and professional services companies. This new program is called ‘online apprenticeship’ and aims to build fully online, company-tailored curricula, source candidates, provide on-the-job training, and award them with a bachelor's or master's degree

In April 2021, OpenClassrooms announced it had raised $80 million in funding from investors including the Chan Zuckerberg Initiative.

== Talks and awards ==
In 2015, Mathieu Nebra was named among MIT Innovators Under 35 by MIT Technology Review. In 2016, Pierre Dubuc became one of the Forbes 30 Under 30, in the category "social entrepreneurship".

In May 2016, OpenClassrooms won the ACSEL’R award for digital transformation.

In November 2016, co-founder Pierre Dubuc presented his vision of the education of the future at the Young Leaders session during the World Policy Conference 2016.

In July 2017, OpenClassrooms was one of the finalists at the EdTechXGlobal Europe.
