= ECampusOntario =

Canadian non-profit organization

eCampusOntario is a provincially-funded non-profit organization that leads a consortium of Ontario’s publicly-funded colleges, universities and Indigenous institutes to develop and test online learning tools to advance the use of education technology and digital learning environments.

== Online Portal ==
In 2015, the organization launched its website, which was built around an online course portal. The portal exists to help Internet users locate and browse the online and technology-enabled courses and programs on offer by Ontario’s 45 public post-secondary institutions.

== Open Textbook Library ==
In 2016, the organization released an online Open Textbook Library, developed in collaboration with BCcampus and Ryerson University. The library contains free open textbooks that are available for public use. Some of the textbooks are aligned with Ontario post-secondary courses.

== Educational Technology Sandbox ==
eCampusOntario also maintains an Educational Technology Sandbox, an online environment that allows select member institutions the opportunity to explore and test new tools that support technology-enabled teaching and learning. These include an Open Badging initiative, an experiential learning platform called Riipen, and a Virtual Reality Lab platform developed by a company called Labster.

== Organizational Funds ==
eCampusOntario also funds the development of educational research, eLearning resources and online and technology-enabled courses. It has three major funds: the Open Content Fund, the Program Development Fund, and the Research and Innovation Fund. A total of $17.7M in funding was awarded to institutions and educators during the 2016-2017 and 2017-2018 fiscal years.
