= W3Schools =

Web development information website

- Website type: Web development portal
- Available in: Multiple languages
- Owner: Refsnes Data AS
- Creator: Refsnes Data AS
- Website: www.w3schools.com
- Commercial: Yes
- Registration: Required for forum
- Launched: 1998; 28 years ago
- Current status: Active

W3Schools is a freemium educational website for learning computer programming online. Initially released in 1998, it derives its name from the World Wide Web but is not affiliated with the W3 Consortium. The domain name for the website was registered on March 21, 2000.

W3Schools offers courses covering many aspects of web development. W3Schools also publishes free HTML templates. It is run by Refsnes Data in Norway. It has an online text editor called Tryit Editor, and readers can edit examples and run the code in a test environment. The website also offers free hosting for small static websites.

== Functions ==
On the site, source code examples with explanations are shown free of charge in English, most of which can also be edited and executed interactively in a live editor. Other important code elements are hidden so that the user can focus on the code shown (developer sandbox). The tutorials are divided into individual chapters on the development languages. In addition to the basics, application-related implementation options and examples, and individual elements of the programming language (so-called "references"), are documented. In addition, there is a YouTube channel explaining topics in web development, and an Internet forum. Technologies such as HTML, CSS, JavaScript, JSON, C, C++, C#, Java, PHP, React, AngularJS, SQL, Python, Django, Bootstrap, Node.js, jQuery, XQuery, Ajax, and XML are all supported.

== See also ==
- MDN Web Docs – similar website
- List of online educational resources
