= Coursmos =

Online micro-learning platform

- "An online micro-learning platform designed to educate Generation Distracted"
- Industry: Online Microlearning
- Founded: 7 January 2014
- Founder: Roman Kostochka; Vyacheslav Grachev; Kate Seledets; Paul Shuteyev; Igor Gonebnyy; Alex Sinichkin
- Headquarters: San Francisco, California, U.S.A.
- Area served: International (online)
- Website: coursmos.com

Coursmos is an online micro-learning platform. It offered approximately 50,000 lessons within approximately 11,000 courses with courses broken down into smaller lessons, typically no longer than three minutes each.

== History ==
Coursmos was founded by Roman Kostochka and Vyacheslav Grachev. The concept was developed based on a YouTube study that documented people watching users video of up to three minutes with longer videos getting abandoned. Coursmos was a participant in Happy Farm, an American-Ukrainian Business Accelerator. Although founded in Russia, it moved its headquarters to San Francisco, California in 2013, the same year the site was first launched. Coursmos was designed as a mobile-first application, launching as a mobile app in the Apple Appstore and following up with an app in Google Play. The web platform of the company was launched in early 2014.

Funding for Coursmos came by the way of the co-founders, and later pre-seed funding in the amount of $150,000 from outside investors. It received an additional $530,000 in funding in June 2014, coming from Imperious Group as well as an angel investor who was unnamed. The funding was used to expand the company and develop features that allow for better search engine capabilities of lessons, converting video to text to make lessons searchable. It also announced the addition of features that include YouTube integration and a content widget for lessons to be shared on other website. In 2015, the company received $600,000 in additional funding from both Imperious and Altera Capital Group. This funding was reported to be used to build a corporate user platform that can be used by online classes.

As of 2015, Coursmos has raised $1.2 million since its launch.

== Courses ==
Coursmos offers 50,000 video lessons which are grouped within 11,000 micro-courses. Each course has no more than three minute lessons within, meaning that the length of each course rarely exceeds a total of fifteen minutes. Each course is designed so that it can be taken in a short time as opposed to users giving a long-form commitment of several weeks, separating it from massive open online course platform models. Coursmos has an adaptive recommendation system for users to receive personal micro course selections. Based on skills and interests of the user, Coursmos recommends the courses for that user to take.

Courses are user-generated and allow other users to flag those with better quality content to rate the better courses. Most courses are free, with the site also allowing for paid-course content and provides a revenue share to authors. The platform allows anyone to create a micro-course, with approximately 4,000 of the website's users also being creators or "authors" of courses.

In January 2015, Coursmos had 520,000 registered students.

== Reception ==
TechCrunch referred to Coursmos as a "bite-sized e-learning platform for the Twitter Generation" as well as an "app to educate Generation Distraction." Coursmos' investors were also attracted to the company based on the idea of filling the need of people wanting to learn quick and having the time to learn, unlike a MOOC platform. It has also been featured in major publications including TechCrunch and The Economist.

== See also ==
- Computer-supported collaborative learning
- Disruptive innovation
- Educational psychology
- Educational technology
