= Google AI Studio =

Web-based IDE for prototyping with Google's generative AI models

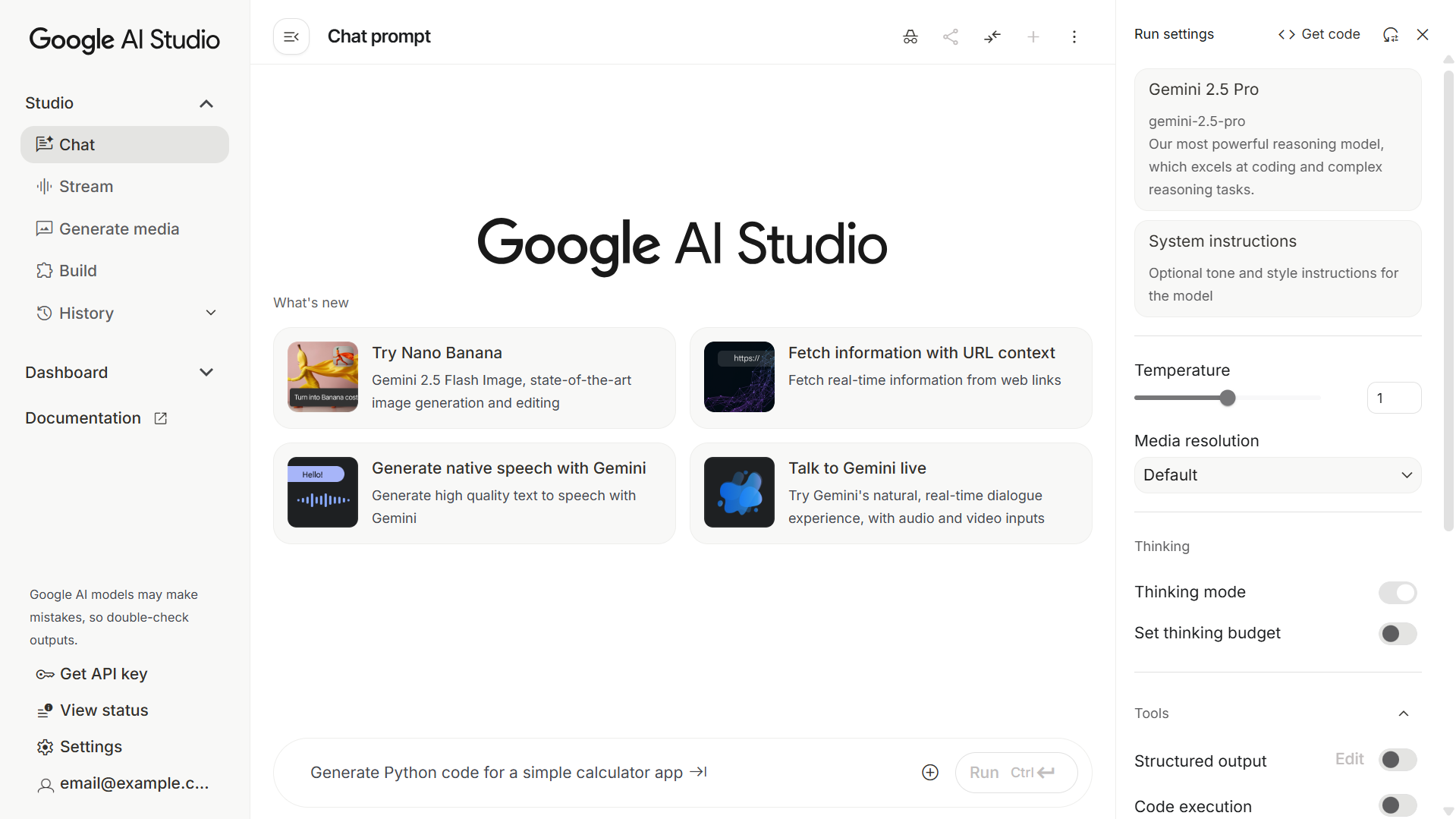
- Screenshot The Google AI Studio user interface in October 2025, showing the Chat Prompt, model selection, and various run settings
- Developer: Google
- Release: December 13, 2023; 2 years ago (as AI Studio, with Gemini)
- Operating system: Cross-platform (web application)
- Predecessor: Google MakerSuite
- Type: Integrated development environment (IDE) for generative AI
- License: Proprietary with a free tier
- Website: aistudio.google.com

Google AI Studio is a web-based integrated development environment developed by Google for prototyping applications using generative AI models. Released in December 2023 alongside the Gemini API, the platform provides access to Google's Gemini family of models and related tools for image, video, and audio generation. The service targets both developers and non-technical users for testing prompts and generating code for the Gemini API.

== History ==
Google launched AI Studio on December 13, 2023, as the successor to Google MakerSuite. MakerSuite, introduced at Google I/O in May 2023, had provided similar functionality for Google's PaLM language models. The AI Studio was launched alongside the public release of the Gemini API.

== Features ==
AI Studio's interface consists of a central prompt area and a settings panel for model selection and parameter adjustment. The platform supports chat prompts for multi-turn conversations and includes system instructions for defining model behavior, tone, or specific rules. Users can employ zero-shot and few-shot prompting techniques to guide the model's output format.

The platform processes various media types including video, audio, and documents, and can generate images through Imagen models, videos through Veo models, and audio through text-to-speech functionality. Additional tools include real-time streaming for screen sharing and live analysis, code execution in a sandboxed Python environment, grounding with Google Search for current information, URL context for analyzing specific web pages, and a thinking mode for complex reasoning tasks.

== Available models ==
The platform provides access to several Google AI models including the Gemini language models, Imagen for image generation, Veo for video generation, LearnLM for educational applications, and Gemma, Google's open-source model family.

== Privacy and data usage ==
Google AI Studio's data handling differs between free and paid users. For free tier users, Google uses submitted prompts, uploaded files, and generated responses to improve its products and services, with human reviewers potentially reading and annotating the data after disconnection from user accounts. Google advises against submitting sensitive information on the free tier. Users who enable Google Cloud Billing are considered paid service users, and their data is not used for product improvement. Data is processed according to Google's Data Processing Addendum and retained temporarily for abuse monitoring.

== Availability ==
The platform is available at no cost, with API usage subject to a free tier with daily and per-minute rate limits. Access is restricted to users aged 18 and older in specific countries and territories. The service was initially unavailable in the United Kingdom and European Economic Area due to regulatory concerns, which drew user complaints.

== Reception ==
Reviews have noted the platform's accessibility and integration with Gemini models, with features such as real-time screen sharing and large context windows cited as notable capabilities. However, reviewers have raised concerns about the privacy implications for free tier users, whose data is used for model training. Some users have reported inconsistent performance with features like screen streaming and issues with folder uploads for large datasets. The initial geographic restrictions were a point of criticism among developers in affected regions.

== See also ==
- Google Gemini – Chatbot developed by Google
- Hugging Face – American machine learning company
