= CodePen =

Webpage development and presentation tool

- Available in: English
- Founders: Alex Vazquez; Tim Sabat; Chris Coyier
- Website: codepen.io
- Commercial: Yes
- Registration: Optional
- Users: 339,000
- Launched: 2012; 14 years ago

CodePen is an online community for testing and showcasing user-created HTML, CSS and JavaScript code snippets. It functions as an online code editor and open-source learning environment, where developers can create code snippets, called "pens," and test them. It was founded in 2012 by full-stack developers Alex Vazquez and Tim Sabat and front-end designer Chris Coyier. Its employees work remotely, rarely all meeting together in person. CodePen is a large community for web designers and developers to showcase their coding skills, with an estimated 330,000 registered users and 14.16 million monthly visitors.
