= Replit =

Company and online coding environment

Replit, Inc
- Logo
- Formerly: Repl.it
- Founded: 2016; 10 years ago in San Francisco, California, US
- Founders: Amjad Masad; Faris Masad; Haya Odeh
- Headquarters: Foster City, California
- Number of locations: 2 offices (2022)
- Services: Hosting, IDE
- Website: replit.com

Replit (/ˈrɛplɪt/), formerly Repl.it, is an American technology company that operates a cloud-based platform for writing and running software. Founded in 2016, the company first developed a browser-based Online integrated development environment (IDE) that supported multiple programming languages. It later added tools that use artificial intelligence to generate code.

== History ==
According to Amjad Masad the original idea behind the product dates from 2009, when he first imagined a collaborative browser-based development environment built on the same premise as Google Docs. In 2011, he produced an early open-source version of this concept, called "JSRepl", which he claims was used for in-browser tutorials at Codecademy and Udacity.

Replit was founded in 2016 by Jordanian programmers Amjad Masad, Faris Masad, and designer Haya Odeh. It was incorporated in San Mateo. Its name comes from the acronym REPL, which stands for "read–evaluate–print loop". Initially a collaborative coding platform, Replit became with Agent an AI-powered software creation ecosystem centered around the ability to build complete applications by describing them in natural language.

In September 2024, Replit introduced Replit Agent, an AI agent for automating software development, with which users can interact in natural language.

In July 2025, Replit announced a partnership with Microsoft to integrate its development platform with Microsoft's enterprise tools, including the Azure cloud infrastructure, making Replit's services available through the Azure Marketplace. That same month, Replit's AI agent went "rogue" and deleted a client company's entire database during a code freeze, against the prompter's wishes. This incident earned a nomination in the 2025 AI Darwin Awards.

== See also ==
- List of AI-assisted software development tools
- Vibe coding
