= CodeMirror =

JavaScript component that provides a code editor in the browser

- Developer: Marijn Haverbeke
- Stable release: 6.x / 30 January 2026; 7 months ago
- Written in: JavaScript
- Platform: Web
- Type: Source code editor
- License: MIT
- Website: codemirror.net
- Repository: code.haverbeke.berlin/codemirror/dev

CodeMirror is a JavaScript component that provides a code editor in the browser. It has a rich programming API and a focus on extensibility.

== History ==
The first version of the editor was written early 2007, for the console in the Eloquent JavaScript website. The code was first packaged up and released under the name CodeMirror in May 2007. This version was based on the contentEditable feature of browsers.

In late 2010, the Ace project, another JavaScript-based code editor, pioneered new implementation techniques and demonstrated that it is possible, even in JavaScript, to handle documents with many thousands of lines without degraded performance. This prompted a rewrite of CodeMirror along the same principles. The result was version 2, which no longer relied on contentEditable and significantly improved performance.

Version 6 was released in 2022. The library has been split into a collection of packages, and core packages are released independently.

== See also ==
- List of JavaScript libraries
