= Vercel =

American cloud application company

Coordinates: 37.7977°N 122.4053°W

Vercel Inc.
- Formerly: ZEIT (2015–2020)
- Type: Private
- Industry: Edge computing; Web hosting; Content delivery network
- Founded: 2015; 11 years ago
- Founder: Guillermo Rauch
- Headquarters: San Francisco, California, U.S.
- Area served: Worldwide
- Key people: Guillermo Rauch (CEO)
- Number of employees: 550 (2025)
- Website: vercel.com

Vercel Inc. is an American cloud application company. The company created and maintains the Next.js web development framework.

Vercel provides developer tools, frameworks, and cloud infrastructure to build and maintain websites. It is the maker of v0, an AI tool for developing websites, and AI SDK. In September 2025, Vercel raised $300 million in a Series F funding round co-led by Accel and GIC, valuing the company at $9.3 billion. The company maintains a free and open-source library for building AI-generated products. According to W3Techs, Vercel is used as hosting provider by 1.9% of all websites.

== History ==
Vercel was founded by Guillermo Rauch in 2015 as ZEIT. Rauch had previously created the realtime event-driven communication library Socket.IO and Next.js, the open source framework that Vercel optimized for their platform. ZEIT was rebranded to Vercel in April 2020, although it retained the company's triangular logo.

In June 2021, Vercel raised $102 million in a Series C funding round. In 2023, Vercel released an AI web development tool called v0 that creates web applications with natural language prompts; it won a 2025 Webby Award for developer tools. In 2023, Vercel released a software development kit called AI SDK designed to allow developers to build conversational streaming interfaces in JavaScript and TypeScript. In May 2024, Vercel raised $250 million in a funding round which valued the company at $3.25 billion. Later, in September 2025, the company raised a $300 million Series F, receiving a valuation of $9.3 billion.

In March 2026, Vercel appointed Mitchell Hashimoto, co-founder of HashiCorp and creator of Terraform, Vagrant, and Ghostty to its board of directors.

=== 2026 breach ===
On April 19, 2026, Vercel disclosed a security breach in which certain internal systems were accessed by unauthorized actors. According to the company, the breach originated from the third-party AI tool Context.ai being compromised, which, according to cybersecurity firm Hudson Rock, originated from Lumma Stealer malware infecting an employee's computer after they tried downloading Roblox cheat scripts. The attacker breached a Vercel employee's Google Workspace account, accessing "some Vercel environments and environment variables that were not marked as 'sensitive'". A threat actor claiming to be part of ShinyHunters claimed responsibility and offered stolen data for sale at $2 million on BreachForums, though the post was later deleted and the group reportedly denied involvement.

=== Acquisitions ===
Vercel has acquired a number of other companies. In December 2021, Vercel acquired Turborepo. A year later in October 2022, Vercel acquired Splitbee.

In January 2025, Vercel acquired Tremor. In July the same year, Vercel acquired NuxtLabs, the creator of the popular web framework Nuxt. A year later, in July 2026, Vercel acquired Better Auth and Stakpak, an Egyptian start-up.

== Architecture ==
Vercel's architecture is built around composable architecture, and deployments are handled through Git repositories, the Vercel CLI, or the Vercel REST API. Vercel is a member of the MACH Alliance.

Deployments through Vercel are handled through Git repositories, with support for GitHub, GitLab, and Bitbucket repositories. Deployments are, by default, automatically given a subdomain under the vercel.app domain, although Vercel offers support for custom domains for deployments.

In 2025, Vercel introduced a web application infrastructure model named "Fluid" that enables an instance in a local region to handle multiple requests concurrently, similar to a traditional server, while also maintaining the elasticity of serverless systems.

== Controversy and boycott ==
In September 2025, Vercel's CEO, Guillermo Rauch, posted a selfie on X that he took with the Israeli prime minister, Benjamin Netanyahu, at a private tech meeting in New York, where they discussed artificial intelligence and its application in Israel's economy and defense. With the ongoing genocide in Gaza and the ICC arrest warrants for Israeli leaders, the widespread backlash against Vercel led to the boycott of Vercel.

Many developers and users deleted their Vercel accounts and switched to alternatives. Tech for Palestine endorses the Vercel boycott and supports the migration to Netlify. Amjad Masad offered companies help and discounts when switching to Replit.
