= Eleventy (software) =

Static site generator, a software system for creating websites

- Other names: 11ty
- Developer: Zach Leatherman
- Release: December 20, 2017; 8 years ago
- Stable release: 3.1.7 / 15 October 2026; 14 days ago
- Written in: JavaScript
- Operating system: Cross-platform
- Platform: Web
- Type: Blog publishing system
- License: MIT License
- Website: www.11ty.dev
- Repository: github.com/11ty/buildawesome

Eleventy (abbreviated 11ty) is a static site generator, a software system for creating websites. It is open source software written in JavaScript. 11ty is noted for its simplicity, and for its support of a large number of template languages. Paired with other technologies, 11ty can be used as part of a Jamstack.

11ty was created in 2017 by Zach Leatherman. It was inspired by Jekyll.

== Purpose ==
Like all static site generators, the purpose of Eleventy is to allow the user to create HTML documents more simply than by typing out the documents by hand. This is of particular value for multi-page static websites, which require making the same change to many HTML documents.

Eleventy uses a "static first" design philosophy, meaning that it specializes in creating HTML documents that do not need to be refreshed or updated each time they are viewed by a web browser. Although Eleventy may be configured to run on web servers at request time — creating dynamic web pages — this is not its primary purpose.

== History ==
Eleventy was created by Zach Leatherman, a web developer in Omaha, Nebraska, in 2017. Leatherman was inspired by Jekyll, which is written in the Ruby language, to create a similar system in the JavaScript language. Leatherman says he derived the name "Eleventy" from a story told to him, by his grandmother, about his own childhood mispronunciation of the number eleven.

Among the users of 11ty is the US federal government via Cloud.gov and the US Web Design System.

11ty is distributed under the MIT License. Version 3.0.0 of 11ty was released in October, 2024.

== Features ==
11ty comes with more than 10 templating engines. These may be used separately or together, giving 11ty flexibility to combine content from several sources or authors. Template languages supported include Markdown, Liquid, Nunjucks and HAML.

No front-end JavaScript framework is assumed by 11ty; it is "frontend agnostic." By combining 11ty with a JavaScript framework performing API integration, developers may form a Jamstack application.

Eleventy includes a local web server for use during development, activated with the --serve flag. It "hot-reloads" upon file changes, updating the web browser as the developer works.

Eleventy also has many plugins available, taking advantage of the huge JavaScript ecosystem, there are plugins such as using Sass, helping with navigation, and a mini dev server.
