= TOML =

Configuration file format

- Filename extension: .toml
- Internet media type: application/toml
- Developed by: Tom Preston-Werner; Community
- Initial release: 23 February 2013; 13 years ago
- Latest release: 1.1.0; 18 December 2025; 10 months ago
- Type of format: Data interchange
- Open format?: Yes
- Website: toml.io

Tom's Obvious, Minimal Language (TOML, originally Tom's Own Markup Language) is a file format for configuration files. It is designed to be easy to read and write by being minimal (unlike the more-complex YAML) and by using human-readable syntax. The project standardizes the implementation of the ubiquitous INI file format, removing ambiguity from its interpretation. Originally created by Tom Preston-Werner, the TOML specification is open source. TOML is used in a number of software projects and has libraries implemented in all popular programming languages.

== Syntax ==
Among other constructs, TOML's syntax primarily consists of key-value pairs, section names in square brackets, and comments delimited by a leading #. TOML's syntax is a superset of the INI format. Contrary to the INI format, which comprises multiple competing variants as a result of ad-hoc parsers, TOML has a formally agreed-upon syntax.

TOML supports the following data types: string, integer, float, boolean, datetime, array, and table.

=== Example ===
# This is a TOML document.

title = "TOML Example"

[database]
server = "192.168.1.1"
ports = [ 8000, 8001, 8002 ]
connection_max = 5000
enabled = true

# Line breaks are okay when inside arrays
hosts = [
  "alpha",
  "omega"
]

[servers]

  # Indentation (tabs and/or spaces) is allowed, but not required
  [servers.alpha]
  ip = "10.0.0.1"
  dc = "eqdc10"

  [servers.beta]
  ip = "10.0.0.2"
  dc = "eqdc10"

== Notable uses ==
TOML is used in a variety of settings, such as:

- Jekyll (a static site generator) configuration _config.toml (although configuration through YAML is also supported)
- Hugo (a static site generator) configuration hugo.toml (although configuration through JSON and YAML is also supported)
- Python 3 package manifests pyproject.toml
- Rust package manifests Cargo.toml
- Julia project settings Project.toml and package manifests Manifest.toml
- Blender add-on manifests blender_manifest.toml
- Gradle version catalogs libs.versions.toml
- Mojo Config pixi.toml
- Alacritty (a terminal emulator) configuration alacritty.toml
- Typst package definition typst.toml files.

== See also ==
- Configuration file § File format
