= Flavortown =

Flavortown is a catchphrase often utilized by television personality Guy Fieri.

It may also refer to:

- Flavortown Market in Guy's Grocery Games
- An episode of the 15th season of American Dad!
- A proposed renaming of Columbus, Ohio
- An online program where teenagers could get prizes for building hardware or software projects, ran by Hack Club
