= Tom Preston-Werner =

American software developer & entrepreneur

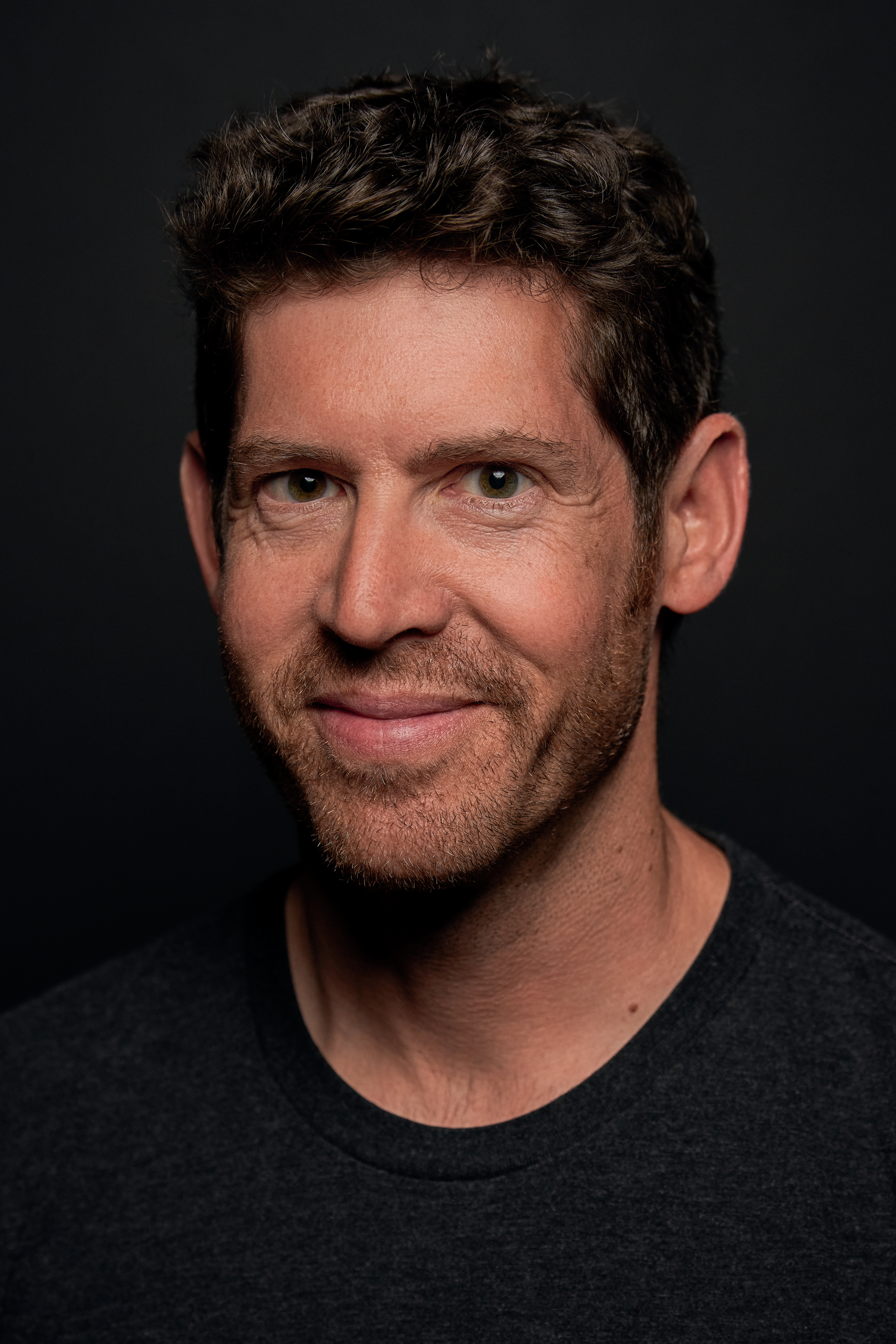
- Preston-Werner in 2024
- Born: May 27, 1979 (age 47); Dubuque, Iowa, U.S.
- Education: Harvey Mudd College (dropped out)
- Occupations: Software developer, entrepreneur
- Years active: 2008–present
- Title: Co-founder & former CEO, GitHub
- Term: 2012-2014
- Predecessor: Chris Wanstrath
- Successor: Chris Wanstrath
- Spouse: Theresa Preston-Werner
- Children: 3
- Website: tom.preston-werner.com

Thomas Preston-Werner (born May 27, 1979) is an American software developer and billionaire entrepreneur. He is an active contributor within the free and open-source software community, most prominently in the San Francisco Bay Area, where he lives.

He is best known as a co-founder and former CEO of GitHub, a web-based Git repository hosting service, which he co-founded in 2008 with Chris Wanstrath and P. J. Hyett. He resigned from GitHub in 2014 when an internal investigation concluded that he and his wife harassed an employee. Preston-Werner is also the creator of the avatar service Gravatar, the TOML configuration file format, the static site generator software Jekyll, and the Semantic Versioning Specification (SemVer). As of 2023, he and his wife have committed to The Giving Pledge—a promise to give away or donate a majority of their wealth to philanthropic causes.

== Early life ==
Preston-Werner grew up in Dubuque, Iowa. His father died when he was a child. His mother was a teacher and his stepfather was an engineer.

He graduated from high school at Dubuque Senior High School and attended Harvey Mudd College in Claremont, California for two years before dropping out to pursue other endeavours.

== Influence ==
As an active contributor to the open-source developer and hacker culture, most prominently in areas involving the programming language Ruby, he has written articles regarding his philosophies and opinions on various issues. He has been featured as a guest on podcasts, including Rubyology and SitePoint.

Preston-Werner was one of the initial members of the San Francisco group IcanhazRuby or ICHR, after he became a regular member of the San Francisco Ruby Meetups. He continued until the meetings became overwhelmed by venture capital investors searching for talent; this prompted him to seek more private gatherings.

Preston-Werner is the creator of the TOML configuration file format.

== Career ==
In an article published by Hacker Monthly in 2010, Preston wrote about his passion for ensuring that developers document the code they write so others can easily understand how it works.

In 2004, Preston-Werner founded Gravatar, a service for providing globally unique avatars that follow users from site to site. Preston-Werner sold the company to Automattic in 2007. In 2005 he moved to San Francisco to work at Powerset, a natural language search engine. Powerset was acquired by Microsoft. Preston-Werner declined a $300,000 bonus and stock options from Microsoft so that he could focus on GitHub.

=== GitHub ===
Preston-Werner co-founded GitHub in 2008 with Chris Wanstrath, P. J. Hyett and Scott Chacon, as a place to share and collaborate on code.

In 2010, Preston-Werner read a comment on Twitter insulting the quality of GitHub's search function. This prompted him to overhaul the service's search, drawing on his experience having worked at Powerset.

=== Resignation from GitHub ===
Julie Ann Horvath, a GitHub programmer, alleged in March 2014 that Tom Preston-Werner and his wife Theresa had engaged in a pattern of harassment against her that led her to leave the company. GitHub initially denied Horvath's allegations, then following an internal investigation, confirmed some of the claims. Preston-Werner resigned. GitHub's new CEO Chris Wanstrath said the "investigation found Tom Preston-Werner in his capacity as GitHub's CEO acted inappropriately, including confrontational conduct, disregard of workplace complaints, insensitivity to the impact of his spouse's presence in the workplace, and failure to enforce an agreement that his spouse should not work in the office."

=== After GitHub ===
Following his resignation from GitHub, Preston-Werner sold his shares in the company to Microsoft. Along with a team of former GitHub co-founders and executives, Preston-Werner then cofounded Chatterbug, a software for language-learning. In 2018, Chatterbug cofounder Scott Chacon announced an $8 million (~$10.1 million in 2025) series A funding round for the company, financed by himself and Preston-Werner. Preston-Werner, a hacker himself, has hosted AMA-style events for student hackers, such as for Hack Club, at the Def Hacks Virtual 2020 hackathon, and Dubhacks 2020.

== Personal life ==
Preston-Werner lives in San Francisco with his wife Theresa and their sons.

His wife is a former graduate student in cultural anthropology known for her involvement in historical research and social subjects.
