= React Router =

Web development framework

- Original author: Remix Software Inc. 2020-2021
- Developers: Shopify and the open-source community
- Release: November 1, 2020; 5 years ago
- Stable release: v8.3.0 / July 23, 2026; 2 days ago
- Written in: JavaScript, TypeScript
- Platform: Web platform
- Type: full-stack web framework / JavaScript library
- License: MIT License
- Website: remix.run; reactrouter.com (React Router)
- Repository: github.com/remix-run/react-router

React Router is an open source full-stack web framework. The software is designed for web applications built with front-end JavaScript frameworks like React and Vue.js. Remix supports server-side rendering and client-side routing. Remix has been presented as an alternative to the popular React framework Next.js.

Initially available through a paid subscription, the software was made open source in October 2021. The team developing Remix (that also developed React Router) was acquired by Shopify in 2022, but has promised that development will stay open-source and "independent".

The Remix team announced at React Conf 2024 that the next version Remix v2 will be merged into and released as React Router v7. In November 2024, React Router v7 released, as the next major version of both React Router v6 and Remix v2. Remix v2 was then merged into React Router v7 as the new "Framework Mode", making it capable of creating full-stack applications.

Remix v3 was announced in May 2025, reintroducing a split between the two projects. Unlike Remix v2 and React Router, Remix v3 is not built on React, instead a custom-built component model. The goal of it is to "own the full stack" without depending on any of the existing libraries.

In June 2026, React Router v8 was released.
