= Alacritty =

Terminal emulator

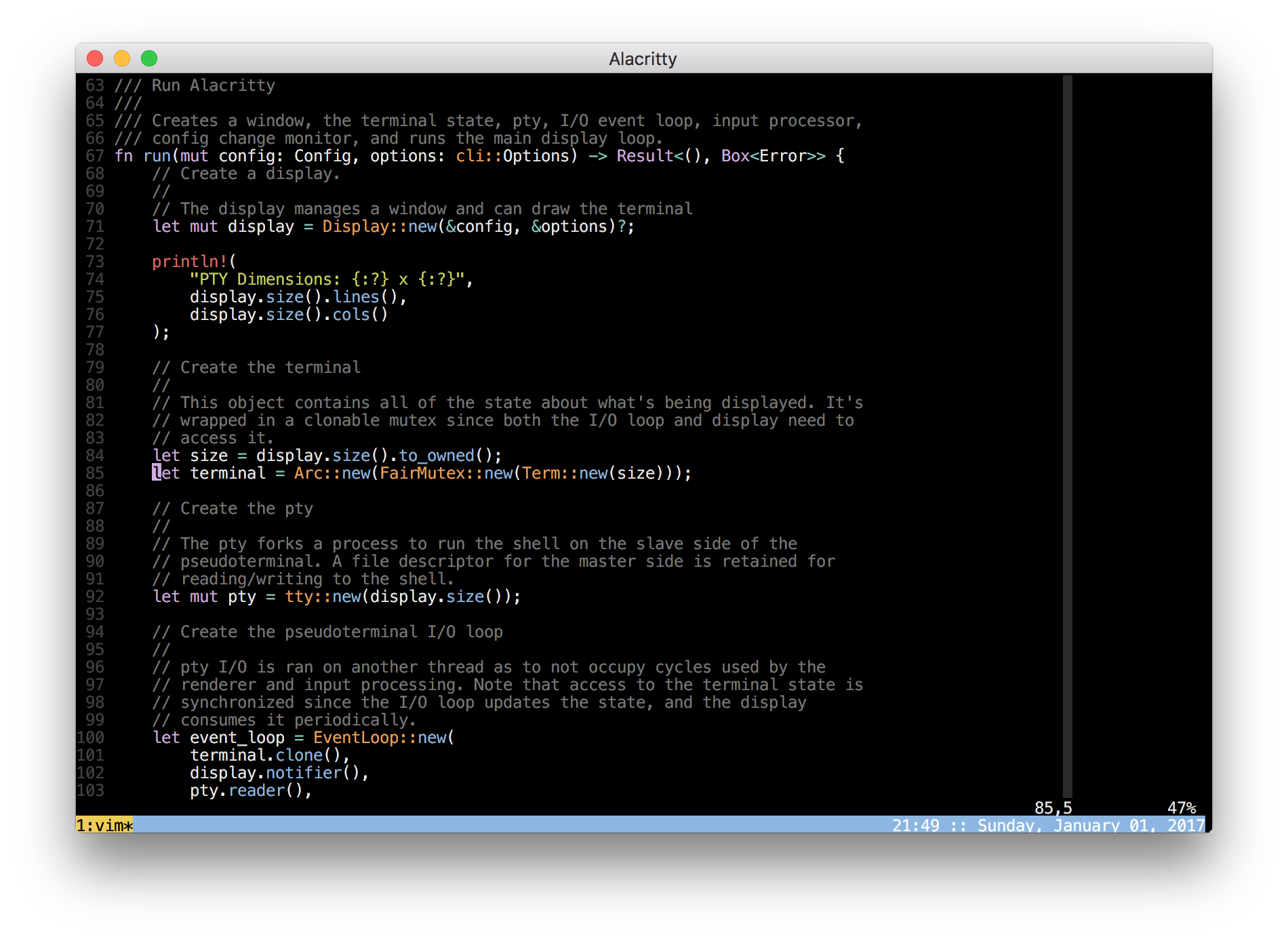
- A screenshot of Alacritty running Vim
- Original author: Joe Wilm
- Developers: Kirill Chibisov, Christian Dürr
- Stable release: 0.17.0 / 6 April 2026; 7 months ago
- Written in: Rust
- Operating system: macOS, Linux, Microsoft Windows, FreeBSD
- Platform: x86-64, IA-32
- License: Apache Software License 2.0, MIT License
- Website: alacritty.org
- Repository: github.com/alacritty/alacritty

Alacritty is a free and open-source GPU-accelerated terminal emulator focused on performance and simplicity. Consequently, it does not support tabs or splits and is configured by editing a text file. It is written in Rust and uses OpenGL.

== History ==
Joe Wilm announced Alacritty in his blog on 6 January 2017. He describes it as "the result of frustration with existing terminal emulators. Using vim inside tmux in many terminals was a particularly bad experience. None of them were ever quite fast enough". He found urxvt and st difficult to configure and criticized their "inability to run on non-X11 platforms".

With the release of version 0.2.0 in September 2018 Alacritty gained support for scrollback.

In version 0.3.0, released in April 2019, Alacritty entered beta stage and support for Windows, text reflow, and clicking on URLs was added.

In version 0.5.0, released in July 2020, a mode with vi keybindings for searching and copying text was added.

In version 0.6.0, released in November 2020, a new Ctrl+C binding to cancel search and leave vi mode was added.

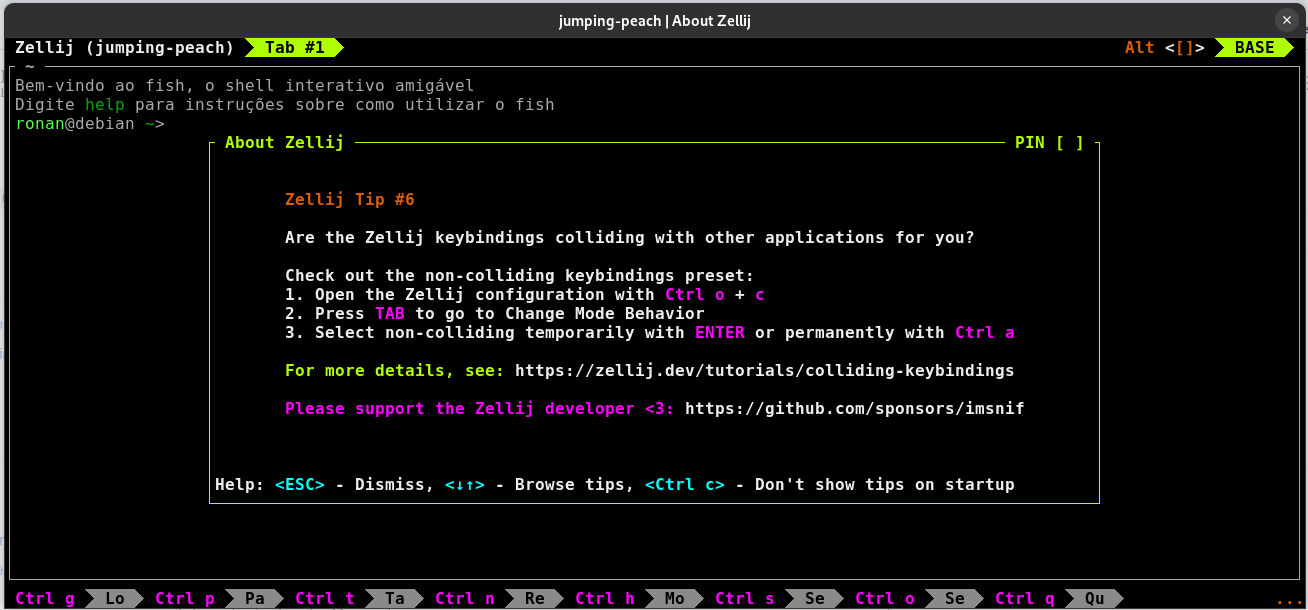

== Features ==
Alacritty supports true color in addition to the standard 16 ANSI colors.

Alacritty explicitly does not support tabs or splits because similar functionality can be achieved with a terminal multiplexer or window manager.

== Configuration ==
Alacritty is configured by editing a template file in TOML format.

== See also ==
- List of terminal emulators
