= JAMstack =

Web development architecture based on client-side JavaScript, APIs, and markup

JAMstack (also stylized as Jamstack) is a web development architecture pattern and solution stack. The acronym "JAM" stands for JavaScript, API and Markup (generated by a static site generator) and was coined by Mathias (Matt) Biilmann, CEO of Netlify, in 2015. The idea of combining the use of JavaScript, APIs and markup has existed since the beginnings of HTML5.

In JAMstack websites, the application logic typically resides on the client side (for example, an embedded e-commerce checkout service that interacts with pre-rendered static content), without being tightly coupled to a backend server. JAMstack sites are usually served with a Git-based or headless CMS.

== See also ==
- Hydration (web development)
- Scaffold (programming)

Named "stacks"

- LAMP (software bundle)
- MEAN (solution stack)
- LYME (software bundle)
