= Hudson Rock =

Israeli cybersecurity company

- Type: Private
- Industry: Cybersecurity
- Founded: 2020; 6 years ago
- Headquarters: Tel Aviv, Israel
- Key people: Alon Gal (CTO); Roi Carthy (CEO)
- Products: Cavalier, Bayonet
- Services: Cyber threat intelligence
- Number of employees: 2–10 (2025)
- Website: hudsonrock.com

Hudson Rock Limited is an Israeli cybersecurity company headquartered in Tel Aviv specializing in infostealer malware. Hudson Rock was co-founded in 2020 by Alon Gal, who previously worked in Unit 8200 of the Israel Defense Forces and Roi Carthy, a technology industry businessman. Hudson Rock has identified data breaches involving personal information from companies including Facebook, Twitter, Airbus, Telefónica, Samsung Electronics, Jaguar Land Rover and Telefónica. In 2024, Hudson removed a report about Snowflake after legal pressure.

== Alon Gal ==
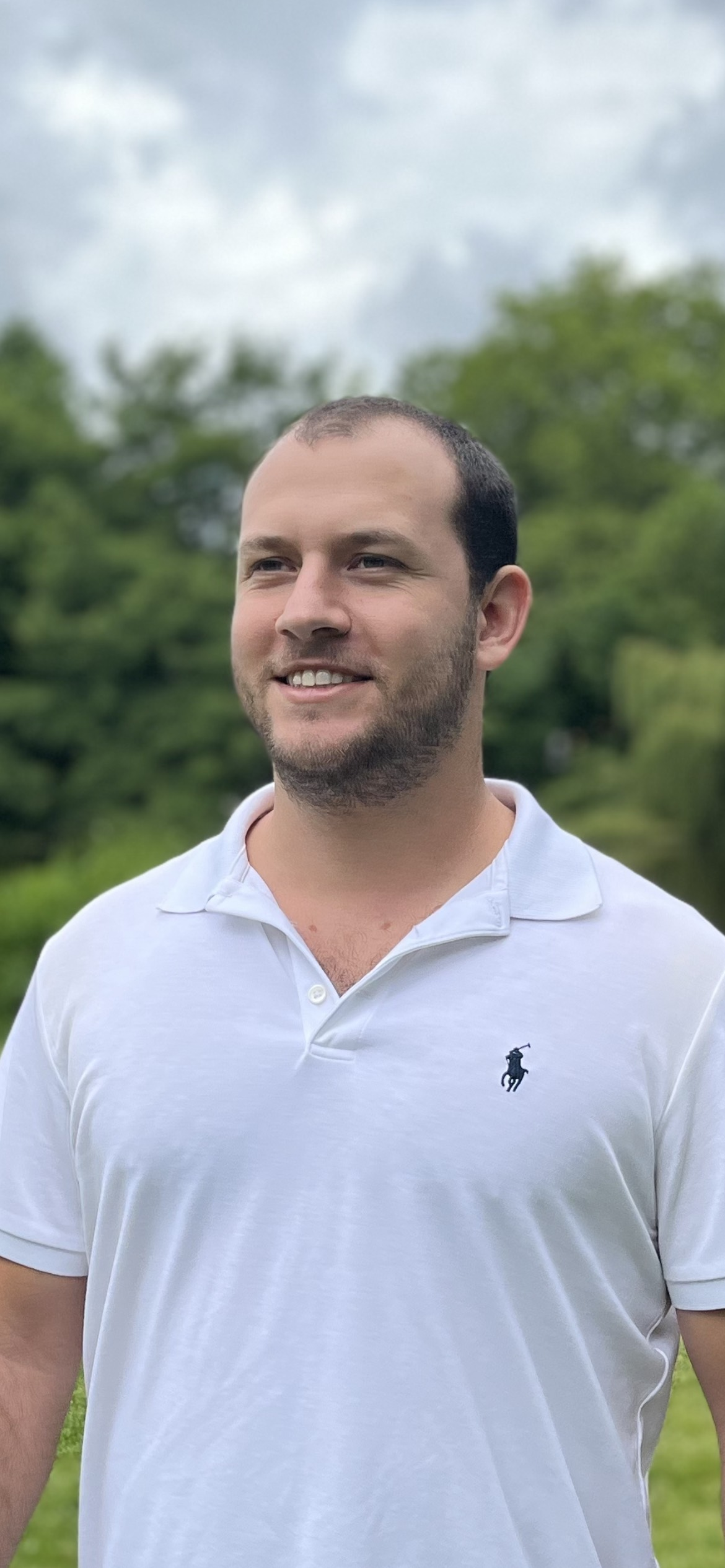
Alon Gal

Alon Gal (Hebrew: אלון גל; b. 1996) is an Israeli cybersecurity expert and entrepreneur. He is the co-founder and chief technology officer of Hudson Rock,

One of Gal's contributions to the industry was to uncover a massive data breach that affected over 533 million Facebook users. The breach included users' phone numbers, email addresses, birthdays, and other personal information. Gal was the first to report the breach, which ultimately led to a $276 million fine for Facebook from the Irish Data Protection Commissioner for violating General Data Protection Regulation laws.

In addition to the Facebook breach, Gal also played a role in uncovering a 2023 data breach that affected over 200 million Twitter users. The breach involved user information, including email addresses, usernames, and other personal information.

Gal's work has also led to the uncovering of other significant data breaches, including a T-Mobile breach that exposed the personal information of 40 million customers.

For a period of time between 2019 and 2021, Gal operated a pseudo-anonymous Twitter account and a Medium (website) blog called Under The Breach, the account gained popularity for the uncovering of several additional data breaches such as the 91 million Indonesian Tokopedia users data leak, the 337,000 Maltese voters database leak which resulted in a 65,000 euro fine, and the 20 million BigBasket users data leak.
