= Hack Club =

US-based nonprofit organization

- Formation: 2014; 12 years ago
- Founder: Zach Latta; Jonathan Leung
- Type: 501(c)(3) organization
- Tax ID no.: 81-2908499
- Headquarters: Burlington, Vermont
- Members: 100,000
- COO: Christina Asquith
- Tech & Creative Lead: Max Wofford
- Board of directors: Zach Latta, Christina Asquith, Tom Preston-Werner, Quinn Slack, John Abele
- Staff: 120
- Website: hackclub.com, the.hackfoundation.org

Hack Club is a global nonprofit network of high school computer programming clubs founded in 2014 by Zach Latta and Jonathan Leung. As of April 2026, it includes more than 1,000 high school clubs and over 100,000 students. It has been featured on the Today Show, and profiled in the Wall Street Journal.

== History ==
Hack Club was founded in 2014 by Zach Latta and Jonathan Leung as hackEDU. At the time, Latta was a 16-year-old who had graduated from El Segundo High School early and was employed by Yo. In June 2015, Latta won a Thiel Fellowship for Hack Club; at this point, he did not plan on attending college. In 2016, Latta and Leung were placed on the Forbes 30 Under 30 list for education. By then, Hack Club was in a total of 62 schools, 16 US states, and 6 countries (United States, Canada, Australia, India, Estonia, and Zimbabwe).

In March 2020, Hack Club relocated from Silicon Valley to Shelburne, Vermont. In April 2020, the Hack Club facilitated an AMA (Ask Me Anything) between its members and Elon Musk. The event was originally planned to last 30 minutes, but Musk was impressed enough with the participants to allow it to extend for over an hour. In 2021, the organization accepted a $1 million donation from Musk. That same year, the organization had clubs in 400 different schools.

In January 2022, Hack Club had over 20,000 students in clubs located in over 22 countries. In July 2025, the number of students jumped to over 70,000.

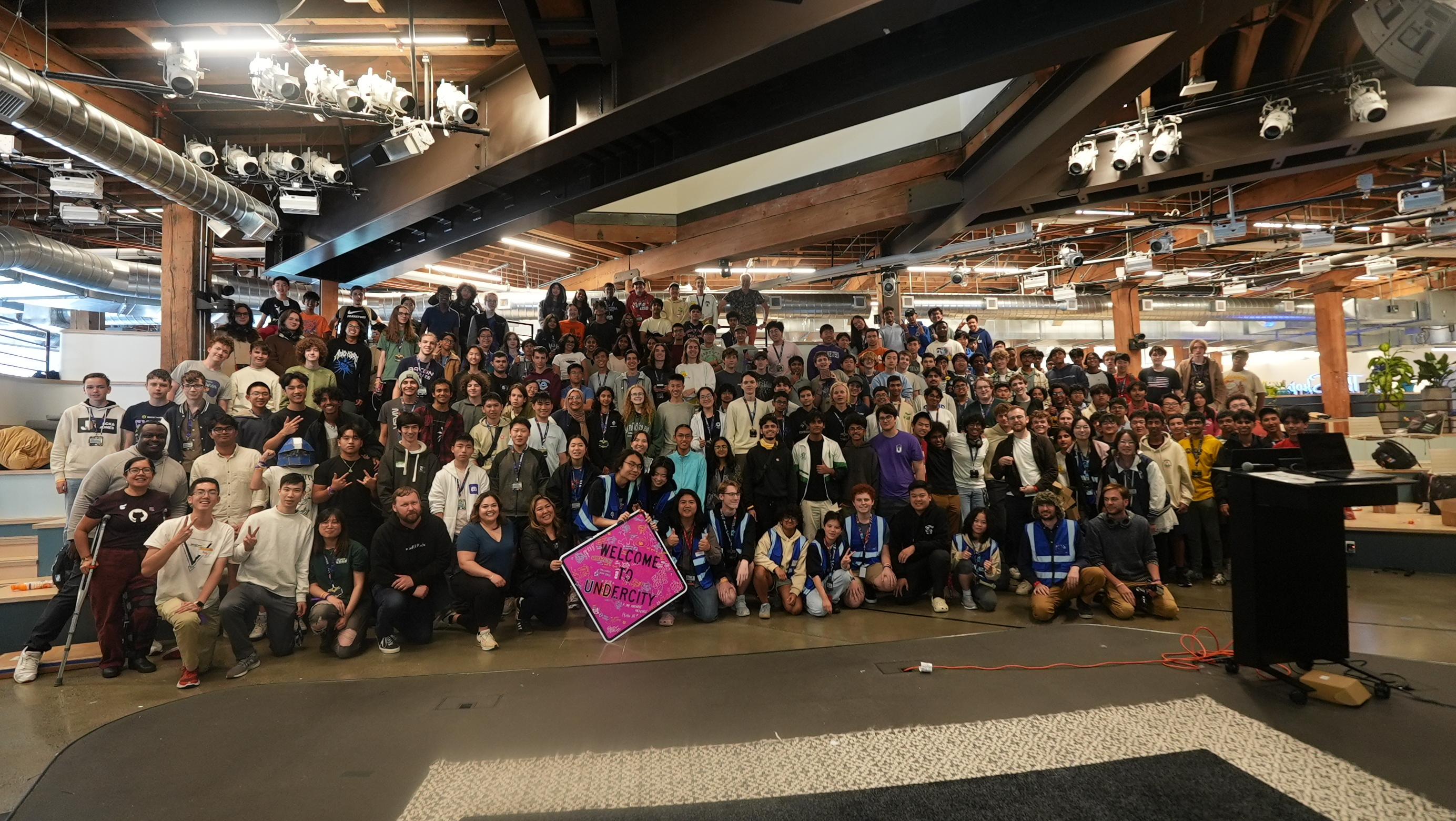
Hack Club members at Undercity, a hackathon hosted in July 2025 at GitHub headquarters in San Francisco

In July 2025, Hack Club hosted a four-day-long event called Undercity at the GitHub Headquarters in San Francisco for teens to build hardware. The event was attended by a total of 180 teenagers, including those from both outside California and the United States entirely.

In May 2026, Hack Club moved its headquarters from Shelburne, Vermont to Burlington, Vermont to accommodate its growth.

== Organization ==
Hack Club consists of several local clubs ran by students in their own schools. These clubs are provided up-to-date curriculum, leadership and community-building training, and software tools by Hack Club. The organization provides grants for hardware such as microcontrollers, circuit boards, sensors, or motors. A Slack instance is also provided for all members across different clubs to communicate with globally. Latta has described this methodology as a "club in a box".
