= Gatsby (software) =

Lightweight javascript framework

- Developers: Gatsby, Inc.
- Release: 2015
- Stable release: 5.14.0 / 6 November 2024; 23 months ago
- Written in: JavaScript, TypeScript
- Platform: Web platform
- Type: Web application framework
- License: MIT License
- Website: www.gatsbyjs.com
- Repository: github.com/gatsbyjs/gatsby

Gatsby is an open-source static site generator built on top of Node.js using React and GraphQL. It provides over 2500 plugins to create static sites based on sources such as Markdown documents, MDX (Markdown with JSX), images, and numerous content management systems such as WordPress, Drupal, and more. Since version 4, Gatsby also supports server-side rendering (SSR) and Deferred Static Generation for rendering dynamic websites on a Node.js server. Gatsby is developed by Gatsby, Inc. which also offered a cloud service, Gatsby Cloud, for hosting Gatsby websites, which was terminated by Netlify in August 2023 to unify it with Netlify Cloud.

Gatsby was launched in 2015. The company raised $15 million in Series A funding in September 2019, and $20 million in Series B funding in 2020. In February 2023, Netlify acquired Gatsby, Inc..

== See also ==
- React
- Next.js
- JavaScript framework
