= Netlify =

American cloud computing company

Netlify, Inc.
- Formerly: MakerLoop, Inc.
- Founded: January 27, 2014; 12 years ago (incorporation); April 7, 2015; 11 years ago (public launch)
- Headquarters: San Francisco, United States
- Area served: Worldwide
- Key people: Christian Bach (Chief Strategy & Creative Officer); Mathias Biilmann (CEO)
- Products: Netlify platform
- Revenue: US$130 million (2026)
- Number of employees: 244 (2023)
- Website: www.netlify.com

Netlify is a cloud computing company that offers a development platform that includes build, deploy, and serverless backend services for web applications and dynamic websites.

The company enables building, deploying, and scaling websites whose source files are stored in the version control system Git and then generated into static web content files served via a content delivery network. Netlify functions are used in building dynamic websites with interactive features. The Netlify platform integrates with various plugins and application programming interfaces (APIs) to add extra features/functionality for web projects.

== History ==
The company was founded in 2014 by Danish entrepreneur Mathias Biilmann who noticed the emergence of Git-centered workflows with modern build tools and static site generators, while running Webpop, a content management startup based in San Francisco. In 2015, Biilmann invited Christian Bach, his childhood friend who was working as an executive at a creative services agency in Denmark, to join him as co-founder in his new venture. In 2017, MakerLoop was rebranded as Netlify.

Beyond the initial focus on hosting for static websites, the company expanded to a broader offering including serverless functions and test and deployment services.

=== Acquisitions ===
On May 19, 2021, Netlify announced the acquisition of FeaturePeek, a Y Combinator and Matrix Partners backed startup that enables developer teams to preview frontend content.

On November 17, 2021, Netlify acquired Y Combinator and SignalFire-backed OneGraph to allow for the composition of apps with APIs and services using GraphQL.

On February 1, 2022, Netlify announced the acquisition of Quirrel, an open-source solution and service for managing and scheduling the execution of serverless functions and jobs.

In February 2023, Netlify announced the acquisition of Jamstack framework and platform provider Gatsby.

On June 29, 2023, Netlify announced the acquisition of Stackbit, a visual editing company.

=== Financing ===
On August 16, 2016, Netlify raised $2.1 million from the founders of GitHub, Heroku, Rackspace Cloud, Bloomberg Beta and Tank Hill.

On August 9, 2017, the company announced that it had raised $12 million in series A funding from Andreessen Horowitz.

On October 9, 2018, the company issued a press release announcing that it had completed a series B round led by Kleiner Perkins, with participation from Andreessen Horowitz, Slack and Flickr co-founder Stewart Butterfield, Yelp CEO and co-founder Jeremy Stoppelman, among others—securing $30 million.

On March 4, 2020, Netlify secured $53 million in a series C round led by EQT Ventures, the venture capital branch of Swedish investment company EQT, with contributions by existing investors Andreessen Horowitz, Kleiner Perkins, and newcomer Preston-Werner Ventures.

On November 17, 2021, Netlify secured $105 million in a series D round led by Bessemer Venture Partners at a $2 billion valuation, with contributions by existing investors Andreessen Horowitz, BOND, EQT Ventures, Kleiner Perkins, Mango Capital, and Menlo Ventures. This brought Netlify's total funding to $212 million.

== Capabilities ==
=== Connect and build web applications ===
Netlify combines a platform for apps that streamlines the workflow for a development team. Netlify Build is a CI/CD infrastructure for frontend teams that is automated and pre-configured. It does not require a full-time administrator to manage the pipeline. Netlify Graph is a GraphQL-based approach to integrating distinct APIs to build a web app that strives to reduce the inherent complexities in mixing different data models, response formats, and authentication schemes; it is integrated with a number of APIs such as GitHub, Stripe, and Salesforce.

Developers write, test, and review code before production with Netlify CLI. Within the CLI is Netlify Dev, which is a collection of development CLIs that brings the Netlify production environment down to a developer's local machine.

Deploy previews are used to view and leave feedback about a web project, with every annotation and comment synced to an organization's productivity tools. Netlify automatically builds a new Deploy Preview as a unique permanent URL for each Pull/Merge Request.

=== Run web applications ===
Netlify Edge is a network used to power web experiences. It is fast due to its global distribution with automated prerendering. With Edge, apps are deployed to multiple cloud providers. Worldwide caches are invalidated instantly as every global deployment is an atomic and instant update.

Netlify Edge Functions allow developers to build fast web experiences by running dynamic content or an entire application from the network edge. Edge Functions are built on open source runtime Deno to work with server-side features from existing web frameworks and edge-first frameworks.

Working as API endpoints deploy server-side code that automatically runs in response to events or completes jobs in the background by coding functions with JavaScript, TypeScript, or Go. Netlify executes functions written as full API endpoints, or functions can be executed directly from the frontend through JavaScript, or they can be called from other services through webhooks.

== Ecosystem and integrations ==
Netlify works with open source contributors, web framework authors, digital agencies, and technology vendors in the modern web ecosystem; developers pick and plug in the tools for their projects. Netlify is an Enabler member of the MACH Alliance, group of independent technology companies that aim to advocate for open, best-of-breed technology ecosystems.

=== JAMstack ===
JAMstack (Note: Also stylized as Jamstack.) is a cloud-native web development architecture based on client-side JavaScript code, reusable APIs, and markup content. It was pioneered and created by Netlify. In its purest form, the idea of JAMstack is that a web application is pre-built into static pages, using content and code to generate the output. In basic terms, JAMstack is a significant shift in focus from the now abstractable back end to the now-powerful front end.

Netlify is the host of the annual Jamstack Conf and runs the annual Jamstack Community Survey.

== Reception ==
In March 2017, Netlify CMS was named "GitHub project of the week" by the Software Development Times.

Netlify has many commercial customers including Google, Facebook, Verizon, NBC, Samsung, Nike, Cisco, and Unilever.
