= List of TypeScript software and tools =

List of software related to the TypeScript programming language

This is a list of TypeScript software and tools, including transpilers, runtimes, web frameworks, compilers, integrated development environments, libraries, and other development utilities.

== Compilers, transpilers and IDEs ==
- Babel — JavaScript compiler with TypeScript transpilation support via plugins
- Bun — JavaScript runtime and toolkit including a package manager, bundler and test runner.
- Deno — runtime environment with built-in TypeScript compilation
- Eclipse Theia — extensible cloud and desktop IDE framework with TypeScript support
- esbuild — fast JavaScript and TypeScript bundler and transpiler
- IntelliJ IDEA — IDE supporting TypeScript via plugins
- Node.js — JavaScript runtime commonly used with TypeScript via transpilation
- StackBlitz — browser-based online IDE optimized for TypeScript and Angular development
- Sublime Text — text editor with TypeScript plugins
- SWC— fast Rust-based JavaScript/TypeScript transpiler
- TypeScript compiler (tsc) — official compiler and type checker developed by Microsoft
- Visual Studio Code — IDE by Microsoft with built-in TypeScript language service
- WebStorm — JetBrains IDE with TypeScript support

== Build tools and bundlers ==
- Parcel — zero-configuration web application bundler
- Rollup — bundler optimized for libraries and ES module output
- Turbopack — incremental bundler developed by Vercel for Next.js applications
- Vite — development server and build tool using native ES modules and fast hot module replacement
- webpack — module bundler for JavaScript applications with loader-based build pipelines

== Debuggers and language tools ==
- Language Server Protocol — protocol used by the TypeScript language service
- Prettier — code formatter supporting TypeScript
- ts-node — executes TypeScript directly in Node.js without pre-compilation
- Typescript-ESLint — linting tool integrating TypeScript

== Frameworks ==
- AdonisJS — backend framework for Node.js written in TypeScript
- Angular — front-end framework developed by Google using TypeScript
- ChoJS - Cross-runtime framework for backend applications.
- Electron — cross-platform desktop application framework
- Ionic — mobile framework using Angular and TypeScript
- NestJS — server-side Node.js framework inspired by Angular architecture
- Next.js — React-based full-stack framework
- Nuxt.js — Vue.js-based full-stack framework
- RedwoodJS — full-stack web framework integrating React front end with GraphQL back end
- Remix — full-stack React framework supporting TypeScript
- SolidStart — full-stack framework built on the SolidJS reactive UI library
- SvelteKit — application framework supporting TypeScript
- T3 Stack — opinionated full-stack web development stack combining Next.js, tRPC and Prisma
- Tauri — cross-platform application framework with TypeScript front end development

== Libraries and package ecosystem ==
- class-validator — decorator-based object validation library
- date-fns — modular JavaScript date utility library
- InversifyJS — inversion-of-control container for TypeScript and JavaScript apps
- io-ts — runtime type system and data validation library
- Prisma — database toolkit and ORM with TypeScript client
- RxJS — reactive programming library using observables for asynchronous and event-based code
- Socket.IO — real-time event-based communication library with TypeScript support
- TanStack Query — asynchronous state management and data-fetching library for web applications
- TensorFlow.js — machine learning library with TypeScript definitions
- Three.js — 3D graphics library with official TypeScript typings
- tRPC — end-to-end typesafe API framework for building client–server applications
- tsyringe — dependency injection container for TypeScript
- TypeORM — object-relational mapping library for TypeScript and Node.js
- Zod — TypeScript-first schema validation library

== Testing frameworks ==
- Cypress — end-to-end testing framework with TypeScript support
- Jest — supports TypeScript via Babel or ts-jest
- Mocha — flexible testing framework supporting TypeScript
- Playwright — browser automation and testing framework supporting TypeScript
- Testing Library — family of testing utilities, including React Testing Library.
- ts-jest — transformer allowing Jest to run TypeScript sources directly
- Vitest — fast testing framework optimized for Vite and TypeScript

== See also ==
- TypeScript
- JavaScript
- List of free software programmed in TypeScript
- Lists of programming software development tools
- npm – package manager for the JavaScript programming language maintained by npm, Inc., a subsidiary of GitHub.
