= Esbuild =

Open-source JavaScript module bundler written in Go

esbuild
- Developer: Evan Wallace
- Stable release: 0.28.2 / 8 August 2026; 4 days ago
- Written in: Go
- Operating system: Cross-platform
- Type: JavaScript bundler
- License: MIT License
- Website: Official website
- Repository: github.com/evanw/esbuild

esbuild is a free and open-source module bundler and minifier for JavaScript and CSS written by Evan Wallace. Written in Go instead of JavaScript, esbuild claims that at the time it was released, it was "10 to 100 times" faster than other bundlers by using parallelism and shared memory usage. It supports TypeScript, JSX, tree-shaking and is extensible through plugins.

== Usage ==
esbuild was formerly used in Vite, a front-end build-tool and development server (it was removed in version 8), and the Phoenix Framework. It is included as a bundler for Angular since v17, Ruby on Rails since v7, and for Netlify Functions.

== See also ==
- Webpack
- Vite
