= Bundler =

Bundler can refer to:

- Bundler (campaigning)
- Bundler (strapping), another name for a strapping machine
- Module bundler, a tool used in JavaScript development.

== See also ==
- webpack, module bundler
