= Science.tv =

Defunct video website focused on science-based topics

Science.tv was a virtual community for people interested in science. It enabled users to upload videos and categorize them according to subject matter and intended audience.

== History ==
Science.tv was founded by Matt Thurling, a digital media pioneer and film-maker based in Bristol, England. Research and development work began in 2005 and the site was launched in December 2007. Thurling wrote the science.tv blog, where he set out the vision for the site and invited feedback and suggestions for improvements.

== Domain name ==
The .tv ("dot-tv") extension is a Top-level domain name, originally associated with the Polynesian island nation of Tuvalu. The entire domain was purchased from the islands' residents in 2000, and the suffix is now increasingly being used for sites featuring, or relating to, video content.

== Technology ==
A look at the source code of science.tv reveals a front-end built with Cascading Style Sheets and JavaScript. Video is delivered using the Adobe Flash codec. The back-end relies on a PHP interface to a mySQL content management system.

== Content ==
The focus of science.tv is user-generated content, and much of the content on the site was actually embedded from other video sites, including YouTube. The intended audience was broad, ranging from school students to academics and professional programme-makers. Users were able to navigate for content via site-wide search, tags and by preset categories, which included: physics, chemistry and biology.
