= Component-based software engineering =

Engineering focused on building software from reusable components

Component-based software engineering (CBSE), also called component-based development (CBD), is a style of software engineering that aims to construct a software system from components that are loosely coupled and reusable. This emphasizes the separation of concerns among components.

To find the right level of component granularity, software architects have to continuously iterate their component designs with developers. Architects need to take into account user requirements, responsibilities, and architectural characteristics.

== Overview ==
CBSE grew out of earlier paradigms such as structured programming and object-oriented programming, but it places greater emphasis on building software by assembling and integrating pre-existing components. Unlike objects, which typically encapsulate both data and behavior, components are higher-level constructs that provide well-defined interfaces and can be deployed independently.

Component orientation underlies many modern software frameworks and architectural styles, including service-oriented architecture (SOA), microservices, and widely used frontend frameworks such as React, Angular, and Vue.

== Considerations ==
An example of two components in UML: Checkout processes a customer's order, which requires the other one to bill the credit card.

For large-scale systems developed by large teams, a disciplined culture and process is required to achieve the benefits of CBSE. Third-party components are often utilized in large systems, raising issues of integration, licensing, and software quality.

The system can be designed visually with the Unified Modeling Language (UML). Each component is shown as a rectangle, and an interface is shown as a lollipop to indicate a provided interface and as a socket to indicate consumption of an interface. This graphical representation helps clarify the relationships and dependencies between components.

Component-based usability testing is applied when components interact directly with the end user, ensuring both functionality and user experience are preserved when components are reused or replaced.

== Applications ==
CBSE principles are used across multiple domains:

- In enterprise software, component-based approaches enable large-scale modular applications such as ERP and CRM systems.
- In embedded systems, components are reused to reduce development costs and time-to-market.
- In frontend development, component-oriented architectures dominate modern web application design, with design systems often mapped directly to reusable code components.
- In cloud computing, microservices architecture can be viewed as a natural evolution of component orientation, where components are independently deployed services.

== Challenges ==
While component-based development improves maintainability and reusability, it introduces challenges such as:

- Ensuring interoperability among components developed by different vendors.
- Managing dependencies and versioning.
- Guaranteeing performance and security when integrating external components.

== See also ==
- Object-oriented programming
- Service-oriented architecture
- Microservices
- Design system
- Software framework
