= Module bundler =

Software tool that bundles source modules into output files

A module bundler is a software development tool that takes multiple source files and their dependencies (modules) and combines them into one or more output files called bundles. Module bundlers are commonly used in front-end web development to package JavaScript, CSS and other assets for efficient delivery to web browsers.

Module bundlers typically start from one or more entry points and build a dependency graph of all imported modules before producing the final bundles, often applying optimisations such as minification and tree shaking.

== See also ==
- Vite
- Webpack
- Esbuild
- Browserify
