= Unidirectional data flow =

Pattern of applying one-way mutations to an immutable data state

In information technology and computer science, the pattern of applying one-way mutations to an immutable data state is called unidirectional data flow. Separation of state changes from presentation has many benefits and was popularized with Redux for unidirectional data flow combined with React for presenting, or rendering, data state.

== See also ==
- Data (computer science)
- Unidirectional network
- Single source of truth
- Diode
