= Crawljax =

Crawljax is a free and open source web crawler for automatically crawling and analyzing dynamic Ajax-based Web applications.

One major point of difference between Crawljax and other traditional web crawlers is that Crawljax is an event-driven dynamic crawler, capable of exploring JavaScript-based DOM state changes. Crawljax can be used to crawl and create a static mirror of any Ajax web application.
