= Angular (web framework) =

Open source web application framework

- Developer: Google
- Release: 2.0 / 14 September 2016; 10 years ago
- Stable release: 22.1.0 / 30 July 2026; 2 months ago
- Preview release: 21.0.0-rc.0 / 29 October 2025; 11 months ago
- Written in: TypeScript, JavaScript
- Platform: Web platform
- Type: Web framework
- License: MIT License
- Website: angular.dev
- Repository: Angular Repository

Angular (also referred to as Angular 2+) is a TypeScript-based free and open-source single-page web application framework. It is developed by Google and by a community of individuals and corporations. Angular is a complete rewrite from the same team that built AngularJS. The Angular ecosystem consists of a diverse group of over 1.7 million developers, library authors, and content creators. According to the Stack Overflow Developer Survey, Angular is one of the most commonly used web frameworks.

== Differences between Angular and AngularJS ==
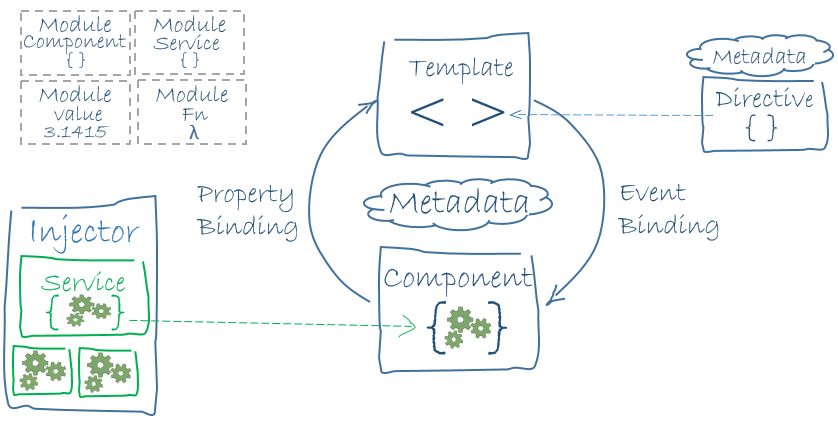
Architecture of an Angular application, services, and dependency injection

Google designed Angular as a ground-up rewrite of AngularJS. Unlike AngularJS, Angular does not have a concept of "scope" or controllers; instead, it uses a hierarchy of components as its primary architectural characteristic. Angular has a different expression syntax, focusing on "[ ]" for property binding, and "( )" for event binding. Angular recommends the use of Microsoft's TypeScript language, which introduces features such as static typing, generics, and type annotations.

== Features ==
=== Component-based architecture ===
Angular uses a component-based architecture, which allows developers to build encapsulated, reusable user interface elements. Each component encapsulates its own HTML, CSS, and TypeScript, making it easier to manage and test individual pieces of an application.

=== Data binding ===
Angular supports two-way data binding which synchronizes data between the model and the view. This ensures that any changes in the view are automatically reflected in the model and vice versa.

=== Dependency injection ===
Angular has a built-in dependency injection system that makes it easier to manage and inject dependencies into components and services. This promotes modularity and easier testing.

=== Directives ===
Angular extends HTML with additional attributes called directives. Directives offer functionality to change the behavior or appearance of DOM elements.

=== Routing ===
Angular includes a router that allows developers to define and manage application states and navigation paths, making it easier to build single-page applications with complex routing.

=== Angular CLI ===
The Angular CLI (Command Line Interface) provides a set of tools for creating, building, testing, and deploying Angular applications. It enables rapid application setup and simplifies ongoing development tasks.

=== Server-side rendering ===
Angular has official support for server-side rendering, which improves an application's load time and performance. Server-side rendering also enhances search engine optimization by making content more accessible to web crawlers.

== History ==
Angular 2.0 was announced during the keynote of the 2014 NG-Conf conference 16–17 January 2014. On April 30, 2015, the Angular developers announced that Angular 2 moved from Alpha to Developer Preview. Angular 2 moved to Beta in December 2015, and the first release candidate was published in May 2016. The final version was released on 14 September 2016.

Version 8 of Angular introduced a new compilation and rendering pipeline, Ivy, and version 9 of Angular enabled Ivy by default. Angular 13 removed the deprecated former compiler, View Engine. Angular 14 introduced standalone components and Angular 17 made them the default, de-emphasizing the use of modules.

Angular 18, released in 2024, introduced several improvements such as standalone components defaulting to true, built-in control flow syntax, zoneless support previews, and modern SSR debugging tools.^{[44]}

=== Naming ===
The rewrite of AngularJS was called "Angular 2", but this led to confusion among developers. To clarify, the team announced that separate names should be used for each framework with "AngularJS" referring to the 1.X versions and "Angular" without the "JS" referring to versions 2 and up.

=== Version history ===
Version	Release date	New features
Angular 22	June 3, 2026	Stable Signal forms and Stable accessible components with Angular ARIA.
Angular 21	November 19, 2025	Experimental Signal forms, Experimental accessible components with Angular ARIA and Zoneless by default
Angular 20	May 28, 2025	by default Angular CLI will not generate suffixes for components, directives, services, and pipes.
Angular 19	November 19, 2024	Angular directives, components and pipes are now standalone by default.
Angular 18	May 22, 2024	Experimental zoneless change detection support and server-side rendering improvements.
Angular 17	November 8, 2023	Standalone is now the new default for the CLI (Application builder), without the need for Angular modules (NgModule), a new syntax for control flow and documentation website.
Angular 16	3 May 2023	Partial hydration for Angular Universal server-side rendering, experimental Jest support, and esbuild-based build system for development servers.
Angular 15	November 18, 2022	Standalone APIs, directive composition API.
Angular 14	2 June 2022	Typed forms, standalone components, and new primitives in the Angular CDK (component dev kit).
Angular 13	4 November 2021	Removed deprecated View Engine renderer.
Angular 12	12 May 2021	Deprecated support for Internet Explorer 11.
Angular 11	11 November 2020	Experimental Webpack 5 support
Angular 10	24 June 2020	New Date Range Picker (Material UI library).
Angular 9	6 February 2020	Improved build times, enabling AOT on by default
Angular 8	28 May 2019	Differential loading for all application code, Dynamic imports for lazy routes, Web workers, TypeScript 3.4 support, and Angular Ivy as an opt-in preview.
Angular 7	18 October 2018	Updates regarding Application Performance, Angular Material & CDK, Virtual Scrolling, Improved Accessibility of Selects. Support for Content Projection using web standard for custom elements, and dependency updates regarding TypeScript 3.1, RxJS 6.3 and Node.js 10.
Angular 6	4 May 2018	Experimental custom element support, added ng update command
Angular 5	1 November 2017	Support for progressive web apps, a build optimizer and improvements related to Material Design.
Angular 4.3	18 July 2017	HttpClient for making HTTP requests, conditionally disabling animations, new router life cycle events for Guards and Resolvers. Minor release, meaning that it contains no breaking changes and that it is a drop-in replacement for Angular 4.x.x.
Angular 4	23 March 2017	Added ngIf and ngFor. Backward compatible with Angular 2.
Angular 2	14 September 2016	Initial release

=== Future releases ===
Since v9, the Angular team has moved all new applications to use the Ivy compiler and runtime. They will be working on Ivy to improve output bundle sizes and development speeds.

Each version is expected to be backward-compatible with the prior release, yet it is still challenging. The Angular development team has pledged to do twice-a-year upgrades.

=== Support policy and schedule ===
All the major releases are supported for 24 months. This consists of 12 months of active support, during which regularly scheduled updates and patches are released. It is then followed by 12 months of long-term support (LTS), during which only critical fixes and security patches are released.

Supported Angular Versions
Version	Status	Released	Active Ends	LTS Ends	Duration
^22.0.0	Active	June 3, 2026	December 3, 2026 (Note: Active ends or LTS ends dates are not officially announced yet for newer releases. This is an estimate based on the standard 1.5 year lifespan.)	December 3, 2027	1.5 years
^21.0.0	Active	November 19, 2025	May 19, 2026	May 19, 2027	1.5 years
^20.0.0	LTS	May 28, 2025	Nov 21, 2025	Nov 21, 2026	1.5 years

Angular versions v2 to v19 are no longer under support.

== Associated projects ==
Analog
- Developer: Brandon Roberts
- Release: 6 July 2022; 4 years ago
- Stable release: 2.8.0 / 1 October 2026; 12 days ago
- Written in: TypeScript
- Platform: Web platform
- Type: full-stack web framework
- License: MIT License
- Website: analogjs.org
- Repository: https://github.com/analogjs/analog

Analog is a full stack web meta-framework based upon Angular powered by Vite and Nitro.

== Libraries ==
=== Angular Material ===
Angular Material is a UI component library that implements Material Design in Angular. It provides a collection of reusable components that adhere to Google's Material Design specifications, aiming to offer a consistent user interface across different devices and platforms.

Angular Material includes a variety of UI components such as buttons, cards, dialogs, grids, and form controls. These components are designed to be customizable and easy to integrate into Angular applications. Additional features of Angular Material include support for responsive design, theming, and accessibility.

=== Angular Elements ===
In 2018, Angular 6 introduced Angular Elements, enabling developers to package Angular components as custom web elements, which are part of the web components set of web platform APIs.

== See also ==
- React (software)
- Vue.js
- Svelte
- List of open-source web frameworks
- List of TypeScript software and tools
- Comparison of JavaScript-based web frameworks
- Web framework
