= Node stream =

Method for transferring data

A node stream is a method of transferring large amounts of data on mobile devices or websites (such as uploading detailed photographs) by breaking the file or data down into manageable chunks. The chunks of data do not use as much computer memory, so they are less likely to slow down the device, allowing the user to do other things on it whilst waiting for the file transfer to complete.

In technical terms, in Node.js a node stream is a readable or writable continuous flow of data that can be manipulated asynchronously as data comes in (or out).

This API can be used in data intensive web applications where scalability is an issue.

A node stream can be many different things: a file stream, a parser, an HTTP request, a child process, etc.
