= Vite =

Local development server

- Original author: Evan You
- Developer: VoidZero Inc
- Initial release: 20 April 2020; 6 years ago
- Stable release: 8.0.9 / 20 April 2026; 1 day ago
- Written in: TypeScript
- Platform: Node.js, Deno, Bun
- Available in: English; Docs in English, Chinese, Japanese and Spanish
- Type: Development server
- License: MIT License
- Website: vite.dev
- Repository: github.com/vitejs/vite

Vite (French: [vit], like "veet") is a local development server backed by VoidZero Inc. Vite was written by Evan You, the creator of Vue.js. It has support for TypeScript and JSX. It uses Rolldown internally for bundling.

Vite monitors files as they are being edited and upon file save the web browser reloads the code being edited through a process called Hot Module Replacement (HMR) which works by just reloading the specific file being changed using ES6 modules (ESM) instead of recompiling the entire application.

Vite provides built-in support for server-side rendering (SSR). By default, it listens on TCP port 5173. It is possible to configure Vite to serve content over HTTPS and proxy requests (including WebSocket) to a back-end web server, such as Apache HTTP Server or lighttpd.

== Features and performance ==
Vite has a Hot Module Replacement (HMR) system, which reduces wait times during development. Vite supports frameworks such as React, Vue, and Svelte, and has server-side rendering (SSR), code-splitting, and asynchronous loading.

== Viteconf ==
Viteconf is an event that hosts talks about frontend tooling. The conventions in 2022, 2023, and 2024, were held online. In October 2025, the first in-person Viteconf was held in Amsterdam.

== See also ==
- Bun
- Deno
- Vue
