= Browserify =

Open-source JavaScript tool

- Developers: Browserling team and Browserify contributors
- Initial release: 9 June 2011; 14 years ago
- Stable release: 17.0.1 / 3 October 2024; 13 months ago
- Repository: github.com/browserify/browserify
- Written in: JavaScript
- Operating system: Linux, macOS, Windows
- Platform: Node.js
- Type: Module bundler
- License: MIT License
- Website: browserify.org

Browserify is an open-source JavaScript module bundler that allows developers to write and use Node.js-style modules that compile for use in the browser.

== Examples ==
=== Execution ===
$ browserify source.js -o target.js

This adds the source of all the required modules and their dependencies used in source.js and bundles them in target.js. Browserify traverses the dependency graph, using your source.js as its entry point, and includes the source of every dependency it finds.

== See also ==
- JavaScript framework
- JavaScript library
