= React (software) =

JavaScript library for building user interfaces

- Original author: Jordan Walke
- Developers: Meta and community
- Release: May 29, 2013; 13 years ago

Stable release(s)
- 19.3.1 / 14 October 2026; 23 days ago

Preview release(s)
- 19.0.0-rc.1 / November 14, 2024; 23 months ago
- Written in: JavaScript
- Platform: Web platform
- Type: JavaScript library
- License: MIT License
- Website: react.dev
- Repository: github.com/react/react

React (also known as React.js or ReactJS) is a free and open-source front-end JavaScript library that aims to make building user interfaces based on components more "seamless". It is maintained by Meta (formerly Facebook) and a community of individual developers and companies. According to the 2025 Stack Overflow Developer Survey, React is one of the most commonly used web technologies. Based on W3Techs, it is used by 6% of all websites.

React can be used to develop single-page, mobile, or server-rendered applications with frameworks like Next.js and React Router. Because React is only concerned with the user interface and rendering components to the DOM, React applications often rely on libraries for routing and other client-side functionality. A key advantage of React is that it – by default – only re-renders those parts of the page that have changed, avoiding unnecessary re-rendering of unchanged DOM elements. React is used by an estimated 6% of all websites.

== Features ==
=== Declarative ===
React adheres to the declarative programming paradigm. Developers design views for each state of an application, and React updates and renders components when data changes. This is in contrast with imperative programming.

=== Components ===
React code is made of entities called components. These components are modular and can be reused. React applications typically consist of many layers of components. The components are rendered to a root element in the DOM using the React DOM library. When rendering a component, values are passed between components through props (short for "properties"). Values internal to a component are called its state.

The two primary ways of declaring components in React are through function components and class components. Since React v16.8, using function components is the recommended way.

=== Function components ===
Function components, announced at React Conf 2018, and available since React v16.8, are declared with a function that accepts a single "props" argument and returns JSX (JavaScript XML). Function components can use internal state with the useState Hook.

=== React Hooks ===
On February 16, 2019, React 16.8 was released to the public, introducing React Hooks. Hooks are functions that let developers "hook into" React state and lifecycle features from function components. Notably, Hooks do not work inside classes — they let developers use more features of React without classes.

React provides several built-in hooks such as useState, useContext, useReducer, useMemo and useEffect. Others are documented in the Hooks API Reference. useState and useEffect, which are the most commonly used, are for controlling state and side effects, respectively.

==== Rules of hooks ====
There are two rules of hooks which describe the characteristic code patterns that hooks rely on:

1. "Only call hooks at the top level" — do not call hooks from inside loops, conditions, or nested statements so that the hooks are called in the same order each render.
2. "Only call hooks from React functions" — do not call hooks from plain JavaScript functions so that stateful logic stays with the component.

Although these rules cannot be enforced at runtime, code analysis tools such as linters can be configured to detect many mistakes during development. The rules apply to both usage of Hooks and the implementation of custom Hooks, which may call other Hooks.

=== Server components ===
React Server Components (RSC) are function components that run exclusively on the server. The concept was first introduced in the talk "Data Fetching with Server Components". Currently, server components are most readily usable with Next.js. With Next.js, it's possible to write components for both the server and the client (browser). When a server rendered component is received by the browser, React in the browser takes over and creates the virtual DOM and attaches event handlers. This is called hydration.

Under the hood, the server sends a RSC payload, which is a compact and serialized representation of the rendered React Server Components tree. It's used by React on the client to update the browser's DOM.

Though a similar concept to Server Side Rendering, RSCs do not send corresponding JavaScript to the client as no hydration occurs. As a result, they have no access to hooks. However, they may be asynchronous function, allowing them to directly perform asynchronous operations:

async function MyComponent() {
  const message = await fetchMessageFromDb();

  return (
    <div>Message: {message}</div>
  );
}

=== Class components ===
Class components are declared using ES6 classes. They behave the same way that function components do, but instead of using Hooks to manage state and lifecycle events, they use the lifecycle methods on the React.Component base class.

class ParentComponent extends React.Component {
  state = { color: 'green' };
  render() {
    return (
      <ChildComponent color={this.state.color} />
    );
  }
}

=== Routing ===
React itself does not come with built-in support for routing. React is primarily a library for building user interfaces, and it does not include a full-fledged routing solution out of the box. Third-party libraries can be used to handle routing in React applications, such as React Router. It allows the developer to define routes, manage navigation, and handle URL changes in a React-friendly way.

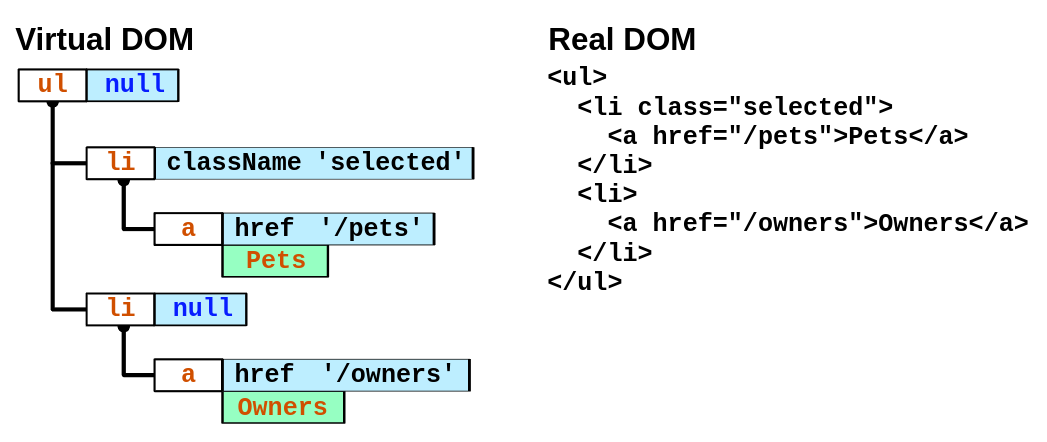
There is a Virtual DOM that is used to implement the real DOM

=== Virtual DOM ===
Another notable feature is the use of a virtual Document Object Model, or Virtual DOM. React creates an in-memory data-structure, similar to the browser DOM. Every time components are rendered, the result is compared with the virtual DOM. It then updates the browser's displayed DOM efficiently with only the computed differences. This process is called reconciliation. This allows the programmer to write code as if the entire page is rendered on each change, while React only renders the components that actually change. This selective rendering provides a major performance boost.

==== Updates ====
When ReactDOM.render is called again for the same component and target, React represents the new UI state in the Virtual DOM and determines which parts (if any) of the living DOM needs to change.

The virtualDOM will update the realDOM in real-time.

=== Lifecycle methods ===
Lifecycle methods for class-based components use a form of hooking that allows the execution of code at set points during a component's lifetime.

- ShouldComponentUpdate allows the developer to prevent unnecessary re-rendering of a component by returning false if a render is not required.
- componentDidMount is called once the component has "mounted" (the component has been created in the user interface, often by associating it with a DOM node). This is commonly used to trigger data loading from a remote source via an API.
- componentDidUpdate is invoked immediately after updating occurs.
- componentWillUnmount is called immediately before the component is torn down or "unmounted". This is commonly used to clear resource-demanding dependencies to the component that will not simply be removed with the unmounting of the component (e.g., removing any setInterval() instances that are related to the component, or an "eventListener" set on the "document" because of the presence of the component)
- render is the most important lifecycle method and the only required one in any component. It is usually called every time the component's state is updated, which should be reflected in the user interface.

=== JSX ===
JSX, or JavaScript XML, is an extension to the JavaScript language syntax. Similar in appearance to HTML, JSX provides a way to structure component rendering using syntax familiar to many developers. React components are typically written using JSX, although they do not have to be (components may also be written in pure JavaScript). During compilation, JSX is converted to JavaScript code. JSX is similar to another extension syntax created by Facebook for PHP called XHP.

An example of JSX code:

function Example() {
  // Declare a new state variable, which we'll call "count"
  const [count, setCount] = useState(0);

  return (
    <div>
      <p>You clicked {count} times</p>
      <button onClick={() => setCount(count + 1)}>
        Click me
      </button>
    </div>
  );
}

=== Architecture beyond HTML ===
The basic architecture of React applies beyond rendering HTML in the browser. For example, Meta (Formerly Facebook) has dynamic charts that render to <canvas> tags, and Netflix and PayPal use universal loading to render identical HTML on both the server and client. React can also be used to develop native apps for Android and iOS using React Native.

=== Server-side rendering ===
Server-side rendering (SSR) refers to the process of rendering a client-side JavaScript application on the server, rather than in the browser. This can improve the performance of the application, especially for users on slower connections or devices.

With SSR, the initial HTML that is sent to the client includes the fully rendered UI of the application. This allows the client's browser to display the UI immediately, rather than having to wait for the JavaScript to download and execute before rendering the UI.

React supports SSR, which allows developers to render React components on the server and send the resulting HTML to the client. This can be useful for improving the performance of the application, as well as for search engine optimization purposes.

The following example from the React Server Component docs demonstrates the application rendering the note and the author's ID.

import db from './database';

async function Note({id}) {
  // NOTE: loads *during* render.
  const note = await db.notes.get(id);
  return (
    <div>
      <Author id={note.authorId} />
      <p>{note}</p>
    </div>
  );
}

== Common idioms ==
React does not attempt to provide a complete application library. It is designed specifically for building user interfaces, and therefore does not include many of the tools some developers might consider necessary to build an application; this allows the developer the choice of software libraries to accomplish tasks, such as performing network access or local data storage.

=== Unidirectional data flow ===
To support React's concept of unidirectional data flow (which might be contrasted with AngularJS's bidirectional flow), the Flux architecture was developed as an alternative to the popular model–view–controller architecture. Flux features actions which are sent through a central dispatcher to a store, and changes to the store are propagated back to the view. When used with React, this propagation is accomplished through component properties. Since its conception, Flux has been superseded by libraries such as Redux and MobX.

Flux can be considered a variant of the observer pattern.

A React component under the Flux architecture should not directly modify any props passed to it, but should be passed callback functions that create actions which are sent by the dispatcher to modify the store. The action is an object whose responsibility is to describe what has taken place: for example, an action describing one user "following" another might contain a user id, a target user id, and the type USER_FOLLOWED_ANOTHER_USER. The stores, which can be thought of as models, can alter themselves in response to actions received from the dispatcher.

This pattern is sometimes expressed as "properties flow down, actions flow up". Many implementations of Flux have been created since its inception, perhaps the most well-known being Redux, which features a single store, often called a single source of truth.

In February 2019, useReducer was introduced as a React hook in the 16.8 release. It provides an API that is consistent with Redux, enabling developers to create Redux-like stores that are local to component states.

== History ==
React was created by Jordan Walke, while he was a software engineer at Facebook, Inc. (Facebook rebranded as Meta in October, 2021). Jordan Walke initially developed a prototype called "F-Bolt", before later renaming it to "FaxJS". This early version is documented in Jordan Walke's GitHub repository. Influences for the project included XHP, an HTML component library for PHP.

React was first deployed on Facebook's News Feed in 2011, and subsequently integrated into Instagram in 2012. The project was officially open-sourced, marking a significant turning point in its adoption and growth, at JSConf US, in May 2013.

React Native, which enables native Android, iOS, and UWP development with React, was announced at Facebook's React Conf in February 2015, and open-sourced in March 2015.

On April 18, 2017, Facebook announced React Fiber, a new set of internal algorithms for rendering, as opposed to React's old rendering algorithm, Stack. React Fiber was to become the foundation of any future improvements and feature development of the React library. The actual syntax for programming with React does not change; only the way that the syntax is executed has changed. React's old rendering system, Stack, was developed at a time when the focus of the system on dynamic change was not understood. Stack was slow to draw complex animation, for example, trying to accomplish all of it in one chunk. Fiber breaks down animation into segments that can be spread out over multiple frames. Likewise, the structure of a page can be broken into segments that may be maintained and updated separately. JavaScript functions and virtual DOM objects are called "fibers", and each can be operated and updated separately, allowing for smoother on-screen rendering.

On September 26, 2017, React 16.0 was released to the public. React 16.0 introduced error boundaries, a new component type that catches JavaScript errors anywhere in its child tree and renders a fallback UI instead of crashing the app.

On October 20, 2020, the React team released React v17.0, notable as the first major release without major changes to the React developer-facing API.

On March 29, 2022, React 18 was released which introduced a new concurrent renderer, automatic batching and support for server side rendering with Suspense. React 18 dropped support for Internet Explorer 11.

On December 5, 2024, React 19 was released. This release introduced Actions, which simplify the process of making state updates using asynchronous functions rather than having to manually handle pending states, errors and optimistic updates. React 19 also included support for server components, and improved static site generation.

In October 2025, Meta announced that it was offloading the React, React Native, and JSX (JavaScript XML) software to a new React Foundation, part of the Linux Foundation, due to vendor dominance concerns. On 24 February 2026, The React Foundation officially launched with Meta Platforms, Inc. contributing the React project to the Foundation.

On 29 November 2025, the vulnerability CVE-2025-55182 (also known as React2Shell) was reported; in vulnerable systems, remote code execution was possible. It was assigned a CVSS highest score of 10.0. This was addressed in versions 19.0.1, 19.1.2, and 19.2.1.

On December 11, 2025, the React team disclosed additional vulnerabilities in React Server Components: denial-of-service issues (CVE-2025-55184 and CVE-2025-67779, CVSS 7.5) and a source code exposure issue (CVE-2025-55183, CVSS 5.3). Fixes were backported to versions 19.0.3, 19.1.4, and 19.2.3.

Version history of React
Version	Release Date	Changes
0.3.0	29 May 2013	Initial Public Release
0.4.0	20 July 2013	Support for comment nodes <div>{/* */}</div>, Improved server-side rendering APIs, Removed React.autoBind, Support for the key prop, Improvements to forms, Fixed bugs.
0.5.0	20 October 2013	Improve Memory usage, Support for Selection and Composition events, Support for getInitialState and getDefaultProps in mixins, Added React.version and React.isValidClass, Improved compatibility for Windows.
0.8.0	20 December 2013	Added support for rows & cols, defer & async, loop for <audio> & <video>, autoCorrect attributes. Added onContextMenu events, Upgraded jstransform and esprima-fb tools, Upgraded browserify.
0.9.0	20 February 2014	Added support for crossOrigin, download and hrefLang, mediaGroup and muted, sandbox, seamless, and srcDoc, scope attributes, Added any, arrayOf, component, oneOfType, renderable, shape to React.PropTypes, Added support for onMouseOver and onMouseOut event, Added support for onLoad and onError on <img> elements.
0.10.0	21 March 2014	Added support for srcSet and textAnchor attributes, add update function for immutable data, Ensure all void elements do not insert a closing tag.
0.11.0	17 July 2014	Improved SVG support, Normalized e.view event, Update $apply command, Added support for namespaces, Added new transformWithDetails API, includes pre-built packages under dist/, MyComponent() now returns a descriptor, not an instance.
0.12.0	21 November 2014	Added new features Spread operator ({...}) introduced to deprecate this.transferPropsTo, Added support for acceptCharset, classID, manifest HTML attributes, React.addons.batchedUpdates added to API, @jsx React.DOM no longer required, Fixed issues with CSS Transitions.
0.13.0	10 March 2015	Deprecated patterns that warned in 0.12 no longer work, ref resolution order has changed, Removed properties this._pendingState and this._rootNodeID, Support ES6 classes, Added API React.findDOMNode(component), Support for iterators and immutable-js sequences, Added new features React.addons.createFragment, deprecated React.addons.classSet.
15.0.0	7 April 2016	Initial render now uses document.createElement instead of generating HTML, No more extra <span>s, Improved SVG support, ReactPerf.getLastMeasurements() is opaque, New deprecations introduced with a warning, Fixed multiple small memory leaks, React DOM now supports the cite and profile HTML attributes and cssFloat, gridRow and gridColumn CSS properties.
15.1.0	20 May 2016	Fix a batching bug, Ensure use of the latest object-assign, Fix regression, Remove use of merge utility, Renamed some modules.
15.2.0	1 July 2016	Include component stack information, Stop validating props at mount time, Add React.PropTypes.symbol, Add onLoad handling to <link> and onError handling to <source> element, Add isRunning() API, Fix performance regression.
15.3.0	30 July 2016	Add React.PureComponent, Fix issue with nested server rendering, Add xmlns, xmlnsXlink to support SVG attributes and referrerPolicy to HTML attributes, updates React Perf Add-on, Fixed issue with ref.
15.4.0	16 November 2016	React package and browser build no longer includes React DOM, Improved development performance, Fixed occasional test failures, update batchedUpdates API, React Perf, and ReactTestRenderer.create().
15.5.0	7 April 2017	Added react-dom/test-utils, Removed peerDependencies, Fixed issue with Closure Compiler, Added a deprecation warning for React.createClass and React.PropTypes, Fixed Chrome bug.
15.6.0	13 June 2017	Add support for CSS variables in style attribute and Grid style properties, Fix AMD support for addons depending on react, Remove unnecessary dependency, Add a deprecation warning for React.createClass and React.DOM factory helpers.
16.0.0	26 September 2017	Improved error handling with introduction of "error boundaries", React DOM allows passing non-standard attributes, Minor changes to setState behavior, remove react-with-addons.js build, Add React.createClass as create-react-class, React.PropTypes as prop-types, React.DOM as react-dom-factories, changes to the behavior of scheduling and lifecycle methods.
16.1.0	9 November 2017	Discontinuing Bower Releases, Fix an accidental extra global variable in the UMD builds, Fix onMouseEnter and onMouseLeave firing, Fix <textarea> placeholder, Remove unused code, Add a missing package.json dependency, Add support for React DevTools.
16.3.0	29 March 2018	Add a new officially supported context API, Add new packagePrevent an infinite loop when attempting to render portals with SSR, Fix an issue with this.state, Fix an IE/Edge issue.
16.4.0	24 May 2018	Add support for Pointer Events specification, Add the ability to specify propTypes, Fix reading context, Fix the getDerivedStateFromProps() support, Fix a testInstance.parent crash, Add React.unstable_Profiler component for measuring performance, Change internal event names.
16.5.0	5 September 2018	Add support for React DevTools Profiler, Handle errors in more edge cases gracefully, Add react-dom/profiling, Add onAuxClick event for browsers, Add movementX and movementY fields to mouse events, Add tangentialPressure and twist fields to pointer event.
16.6.0	23 October 2018	Add support for contextType, Support priority levels, continuations, and wrapped callbacks, Improve the fallback mechanism, Fix gray overlay on iOS Safari, Add React.lazy() for code splitting components.
16.7.0	20 December 2018	Fix performance of React.lazy for lazily-loaded components, Clear fields on unmount to avoid memory leaks, Fix bug with SSR, Fix a performance regression.
16.8.0	6 February 2019	Add Hooks, Add ReactTestRenderer.act() and ReactTestUtils.act() for batching updates, Support synchronous thenables passed to React.lazy(), Improve useReducer Hook lazy initialization API.
16.9.0	9 August 2019	Add React.Profiler API for gathering performance measurements programmatically. Remove unstable_ConcurrentMode in favor of unstable_createRoot
16.10.0	27 September 2019	Fix edge case where a hook update was not being memoized. Fix heuristic for determining when to hydrate, so we do not incorrectly hydrate during an update. Clear additional fiber fields during unmount to save memory. Fix bug with required text fields in Firefox. Prefer Object.is instead of inline polyfill, when available. Fix bug when mixing Suspense and error handling.
16.11.0	22 October 2019	Fix mouseenter handlers from firing twice inside nested React containers. Remove unstable_createRoot and unstable_createSyncRoot experimental APIs. (These are available in the Experimental channel as createRoot and createSyncRoot.)
16.12.0	14 November 2019	React DOM – Fix passive effects (useEffect) not being fired in a multi-root app. React Is – Fix lazy and memo types considered elements instead of components
16.13.0	26 February 2020	Features added in React Concurrent mode. Fix regressions in React core library and React Dom.
16.14.0	14 October 2020	Add support for the new JSX transform.
17.0.0	20 October 2020	"No New Features" enables gradual React updates from older versions. Add new JSX Transform, Changes to Event Delegation
18.0.0	29 March 2022	Concurrent React, Automatic batching, New Suspense Features, Transitions, Client and Server Rendering APIs, New Strict Mode Behaviors, New Hooks
18.1.0	26 April 2022	Many fixes and performance improvements
18.2.0	14 June 2022	Many more fixes and performance improvements
18.3.0	25 April 2024	Adds deprecation warnings for features in React 19.
19.0.0	5 December 2024	Actions, new hooks (useActionState, useFormStatus, useOptimistic), use API, Server Components, Server Actions, passing ref as a normal prop, improved hydration diffs, improved Context API, cleanup functions for refs, improved useDeferredValue API, support for document metadata, support for stylesheets, support for async scripts, support for preloading resources, improved error reporting, and support for custom elements.

== Licensing ==
The initial public release of React in May 2013 used the Apache License 2.0. In October 2014, React 0.12.00 replaced this with the 3-clause BSD license and added a separate PATENTS text file that permits usage of any Facebook patents related to the software:

The license granted hereunder will terminate, automatically and without notice, for anyone that makes any claim (including by filing any lawsuit, assertion or other action) alleging (a) direct, indirect, or contributory infringement or inducement to infringe any patent: (i) by Facebook or any of its subsidiaries or affiliates, whether or not such claim is related to the Software, (ii) by any party if such claim arises in whole or in part from any software, product or service of Facebook or any of its subsidiaries or affiliates, whether or not such claim is related to the Software, or (iii) by any party relating to the Software; or (b) that any right in any patent claim of Facebook is invalid or unenforceable.

This unconventional clause caused some controversy and debate in the React user community, because it could be interpreted to empower Facebook to revoke the license in many scenarios, for example, if Facebook sues the licensee prompting them to take "other action" by publishing the action on a blog or elsewhere. Many expressed concerns that Facebook could unfairly exploit the termination clause or that integrating React into a product might complicate a startup company's future acquisition.

Based on community feedback, Facebook updated the patent grant in April 2015 to be less ambiguous and more permissive:

The license granted hereunder will terminate, automatically and without notice, if you (or any of your subsidiaries, corporate affiliates or agents) initiate directly or indirectly, or take a direct financial interest in, any Patent Assertion: (i) against Facebook or any of its subsidiaries or corporate affiliates, (ii) against any party if such Patent Assertion arises in whole or in part from any software, technology, product or service of Facebook or any of its subsidiaries or corporate affiliates, or (iii) against any party relating to the Software. [...] A "Patent Assertion" is any lawsuit or other action alleging direct, indirect, or contributory infringement or inducement to infringe any patent, including a cross-claim or counterclaim.

The Apache Software Foundation considered this licensing arrangement to be incompatible with its licensing policies, as it "passes along risk to downstream consumers of our software imbalanced in favor of the licensor, not the licensee, thereby violating our Apache legal policy of being a universal donor", and "are not a subset of those found in the [Apache License 2.0], and they cannot be sublicensed as [Apache License 2.0]". In August 2017, Facebook dismissed the Apache Foundation's downstream concerns and refused to reconsider their license. The following month, WordPress decided to switch its Gutenberg and Calypso projects away from React.

On September 23, 2017, Facebook announced that the following week, it would re-license Flow, Jest, React, and Immutable.js under a standard MIT License; the company stated that React was "the foundation of a broad ecosystem of open source software for the web", and that they did not want to "hold back forward progress for nontechnical reasons".

On September 26, 2017, React 16.0.0 was released with the MIT license. The MIT license change has also been backported to the 15.x release line with React 15.6.2.

== See also ==
- Angular (web framework)
- Backbone.js
- Ember.js
- Gatsby (JavaScript framework)
- Next.js
- TypeScript
- Svelte
- Vue.js
- Comparison of JavaScript-based web frameworks
- Web Components

== Bibliography ==
- Larsen, John (2021). React Hooks in Action With Suspense and Concurrent Mode. Manning. ISBN 978-1-72004-399-7.
- Schwarzmüller, Max (2018-05-01). React – The Complete Guide (incl. Hooks, React Router and Redux). Packt Publishing.
- Wieruch, Robin (2020). The Road to React. Leanpub. ISBN 978-1-72004-399-7.
- Dere, Mohan (2017-12-21). "How to integrate create-react-app with all the libraries you need to make a great app". freeCodeCamp.
- Panchal, Krunal (2022-04-26). "Angular vs React Detailed Comparison". SitePoint. Archived from the original on 2023-03-30.
- Hámori, Fenerec (2022-05-31). "The History of React.js on a Timeline". RisingStack. Archived from the original on 2022-05-31.
- Lardinois, Frederic (2017-04-18). "Facebook announces React Fiber, a rewrite of its React framework". TechCrunch.
