= David Cournapeau =

Software developer and data scientist

- Education: Télécom Paris (MSc), Kyoto University (PhD in Speech recognition)
- Known for: scikit-learn package
- Scientific career
- Fields: Data science
- Workplaces: Mercari, Inc.

David Cournapeau is a French data scientist. He is the original author of the scikit-learn package, an open source machine learning library in the Python programming language.

== Early life and education ==
Cournapeau graduated with a MSc in Electrical Engineering from Telecom Paristech, Paris in 2004, and obtained his PhD in Computer Science at Kyoto University, Japan, in the domain of speech recognition.

== Career ==
The scikit-learn project started as scikits.learn, a Google Summer of Code project by David Cournapeau. After having worked for Silveregg, a SaaS Japanese company delivering recommendation systems for Japanese online retailers, he worked for 6 years at Enthought, a scientific consulting company. He joined Cogent Labs, a Japanese Deep Learning/AI company, in 2017. He was a Machine Learning Engineering Manager at Mercari, Inc. until 2023. Since 2023 he is an engineering manager in applied science at Amazon.

Cournapeau has also been involved in the development of other central numerical Python libraries: NumPy and SciPy.
