= John D. Hunter =

American neuroscientist and open-source software developer (1968–2012)

- Born: August 1, 1968; Dyersburg, Tennessee
- Died: August 28, 2012 (aged 44); Chicago, Illinois
- Education: Princeton University; University of Chicago
- Known for: Matplotlib
- Spouse: Miriam Sierig
- Children: 3
- Scientific career
- Fields: Neurobiology
- Workplaces: NumFOCUS Foundation

John D. Hunter (August 1, 1968 – August 28, 2012) was an American neurobiologist and the original author of Matplotlib.

== Biography ==
Hunter was brought up in Dyersburg, Tennessee, and attended The McCallie School. He graduated from Princeton University in 1990 and obtained a Ph.D. in neurobiology from the University of Chicago in 2004. In 2005, he joined TradeLink Securities as a Quantitative Analyst. Later, he was one of the founding directors of NumFOCUS Foundation.

== Matplotlib ==
Hunter initially developed Matplotlib during his postdoctoral research in neurobiology to visualize electrocorticography (ECoG) data of epilepsy patients. The open-source tool emerged as the most widely used plotting library for the Python programming language and a core component of the scientific Python stack, along with NumPy, SciPy and IPython. Matplotlib was used for data visualization during the 2008 landing of the Phoenix spacecraft on Mars and for the creation of the first image of a black hole.

== Personal life ==
Hunter married Miriam Sierig and had three daughters: Clara, Ava, and Rahel.

Hunter was diagnosed with malignant colon cancer and died from cancer treatment complications on August 28, 2012. His memorial service was held at the University of Chicago's Rockefeller Chapel (also the location of his Ph.D. graduation) on October 1, 2012.

== Awards ==
Two weeks after Hunter's death, the Python Software Foundation announced it had voted unanimously to create its Distinguished Service Award, intended as the foundation's highest honor, and issued the first award to Hunter.

== Legacy ==
From 2013 onwards, the SciPy Conference has hosted the annual John Hunter Excellence in Plotting Contest in his honor, with a $1000 prize to continue the advancement of scientific plotting.
