= Scikit-image =

Image processing library for Python

scikit-image
- Original author(s): Stéfan van der Walt
- Initial release: August 2009; 15 years ago
- Stable release: 0.25.2 / 18 February 2025; 36 days ago
- Repository: github.com/scikit-image/scikit-image
- Written in: Python, Cython, and C.
- Operating system: Linux, Mac OS X, Microsoft Windows
- Type: Library for image processing
- License: BSD License
- Website: scikit-image.org

scikit-image (formerly scikits.image) is an open-source image processing library for the Python programming language. It includes algorithms for segmentation, geometric transformations, color space manipulation, analysis, filtering, morphology, feature detection, and more. It is designed to interoperate with the Python numerical and scientific libraries NumPy and SciPy.

== Overview ==
The scikit-image project started as scikits.image, by Stéfan van der Walt. Its name stems from the notion that it is a "SciKit" (SciPy Toolkit), a separately-developed and distributed third-party extension to SciPy. The original codebase was later extensively rewritten by other developers. Of the various scikits, scikit-image as well as scikit-learn were described as "well-maintained and popular" in November 2012. Scikit-image has also been active in the Google Summer of Code.

== Implementation ==
scikit-image is largely written in Python, with some core algorithms written in Cython to achieve performance.
