= Binder Project =

The Binder Project is a software project to package and share interactive, reproducible environments. A Binder or "Binder-ready repository" is a code repository that contains both code and content to run, and configuration files for the environment needed to run it.

Since 2017, when the Binder Project was merged into the JupyterHub project, the development communities share many people in common. A common use of Binder is for sharing a Jupyter notebook in a way that the recipient can immediately execute in a browser.

The Binder project maintains core libraries and documentation for running Binder services, which make those projects available, as well as BinderHub, a tool for deploying such services via common cloud computing environments. A public BinderHub portal is hosted by the community at mybinder.org.

== BinderHub ==
A BinderHub lets you launch a publicly executable version of a Binder repository. Given a URL to a repository, it generates a new URL that anyone can visit in a browser to interact with a running version of the code in that repository.

The public BinderHub, mybinder.org, load-balances Binder instances across a federation of contributing institutions, each of which is running its own BinderHub instance.

== See also ==
- Project Jupyter
- IPython
- RStudio
