= Enthought =

Software company

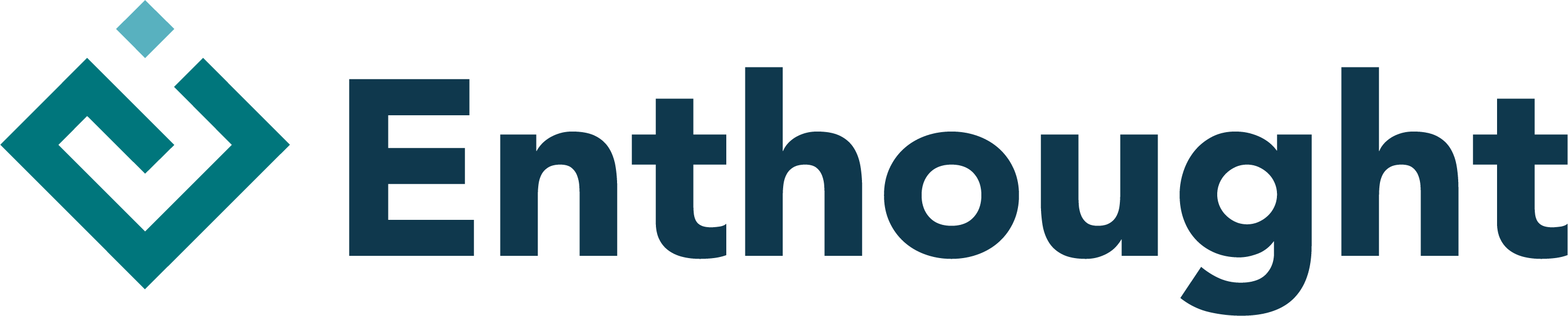
- Industry: Computer software
- Founded: 2001; 25 years ago
- Founder: Travis Vaught, Eric Jones
- Headquarters: Austin, Texas, United States
- Products: Scientific software, consulting, and training
- Website: www.enthought.com

Enthought, Inc. is a software company based in Austin, Texas that develops scientific and analytic computing for R&D. It is known for the early development and maintenance of the SciPy library of mathematics, science, and engineering algorithms, and for its Python for scientific computing distribution Enthought Canopy (formerly EPD). Enthought specializes in advanced artificial intelligence for R&D-critical sectors, including advanced materials, specialty chemicals, electronics, semiconductors, life sciences, energy, and manufacturing.

The company was founded in 2001 by Travis Vaught and Eric Jones.

== Open source software ==
Enthought Canopy Logo

Enthought publishes a large portion of the code as open-source software under a BSD-style license.

Enthought Canopy is a Python for scientific and analytic computing distribution and analysis environment, available for free and under a commercial license.

The Enthought Tool Suite open source software projects include:

- Traits: A manifest type definition library for Python that provides initialization, validation, delegation, notification, and visualization. The Traits package is the foundation of the Enthought Tool Suite, underlying almost all other packages.
- TraitsUI: A UI layer that supports the visualization features of Traits. Implementations using wxWidgets and Qt are provided by the TraitsBackendWX and TraitsBackendQt projects
- Pyface: toolkit-independent GUI abstraction layer, which is used to support the "visualization" features of the Traits package.
- MayaVi: 2-D/3-D scientific data visualization, usable in TraitsUIs as well as an Envisage plug-in.
- Envisage: An extensible plug-in architecture for scientific applications, inspired by Eclipse and NetBeans in the Java world.
- Enable: A multi-platform DisplayPDF drawing engine that supports multiple output backends, including Windows, GTK+, and macOS native windowing systems, a variety of raster image formats, PDF, and PostScript.
- BlockCanvas: Visual environment for creating simulation experiments, where function and data are separated using CodeTools.
- GraphCanvas: library for interacting with visualizations of complex graphs.
- SciMath: Convenience libraries for math, interpolation, and units
- Chaco: An interactive 2-D plotting toolkit for Python.
- AppTools: General tools for ETS application development: scripting, logging, preferences, ...
- Enaml: Library for creating professional quality user interfaces combining a domain specific declarative language with a constraints based layout.

== See also ==
- NumPy
- matplotlib
- Anaconda
- ActiveState's ActivePython
