= Fernando Pérez (software developer) =

Colombian-American physicist and software developer

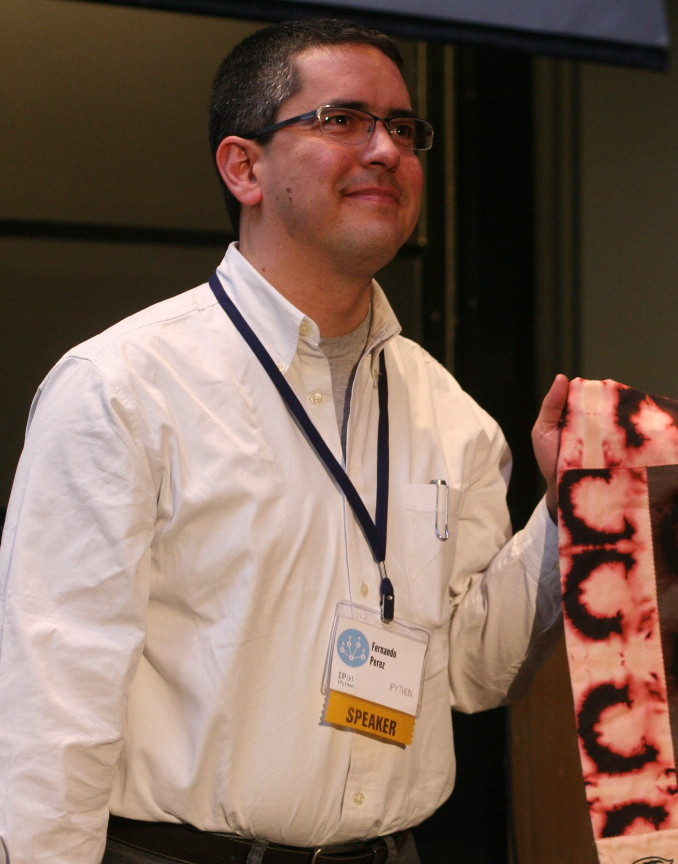
- Pérez in 2012
- Born: Medellín, Colombia
- Education: Physics
- Alma mater: University of Antioquia (BSc) University of Colorado Boulder (PhD)
- Occupation: Associate Professor
- Employer: University of California, Berkeley
- Known for: IPython and Project Jupyter programming environments
- Awards: Free Software Award, ACM Software System Award

Fernando Pérez is a Colombian physicist, software developer, and free software advocate. He is best known as the creator of the IPython programming environment, for which he received the 2012 Free Software Award from the Free Software Foundation and for his work on Project Jupyter for which he received the 2017 ACM Software System Award. He is a fellow of the Python Software Foundation, and a founding member of the NumFOCUS organization.

== Life and career ==
Fernando Pérez was born in Medellín, Colombia, and has BSc in Physics from University of Antioquia and a PhD in particle physics from University of Colorado Boulder, where he worked on numerical simulations in Lattice QCD. He moved to California in 2008, where he currently works as an associate professor in the UC Berkeley Department of Statistics. Previously, he was a staff scientist at Lawrence Berkeley National Laboratory and associate researcher at the Berkeley Institute for Data Science (BIDS). Pérez was named Faculty Director at BIDS stating July 2024.

Pérez began working on IPython as a side project in 2001, and is a co-founder of Project Jupyter, which evolved from IPython in 2014. He received a 2023 NASA Exceptional Public Service Medal for his leadership of Project Jupyter.
