= MayaVi =

Mayavi

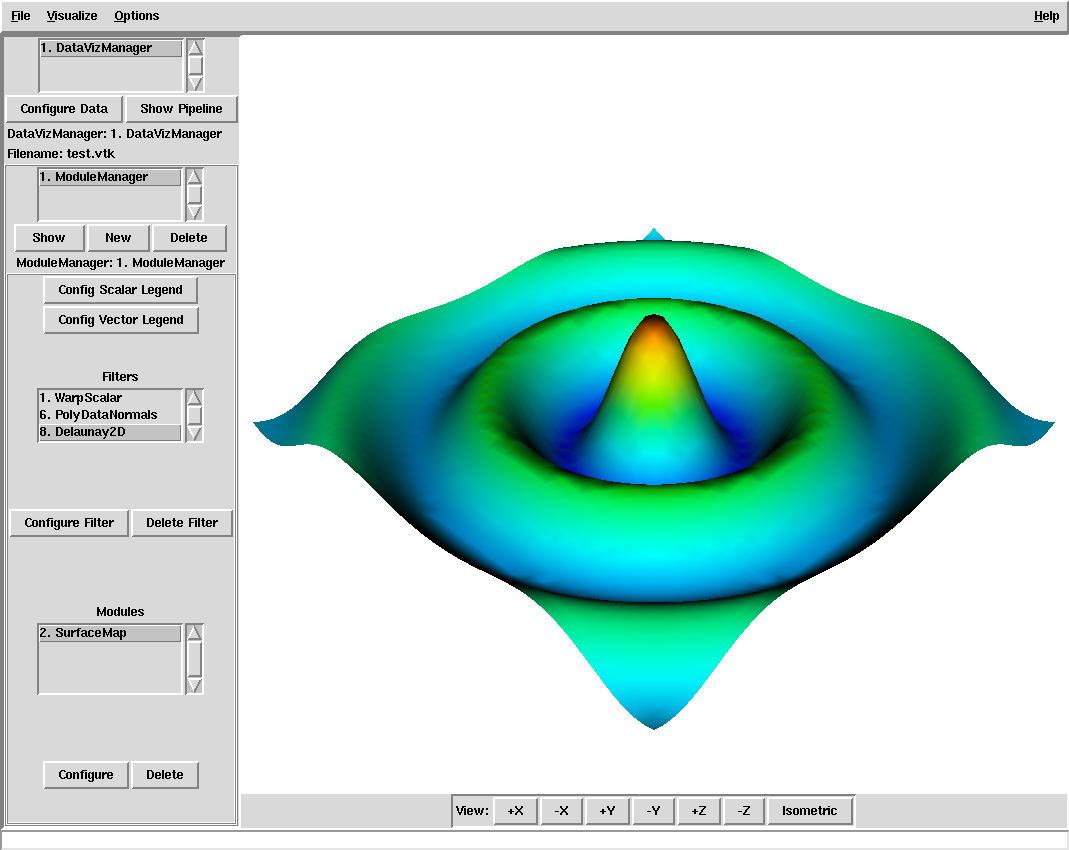
- A screenshot of the main window, with an example visualization
- Developer: Enthought
- Initial release: 2019; 7 years ago
- Stable release: 4.8.3 / 16 May 2025; 9 months ago
- Written in: Python, VTK, wxPython/Qt
- Operating system: Linux, Mac OS X, Windows
- Available in: English
- Type: Data visualization
- License: BSD License
- Website: docs.enthought.com/mayavi/mayavi/
- Repository: github.com/enthought/mayavi

MayaVi is a scientific data visualizer written in Python, which uses VTK and provides a GUI via Tkinter. MayaVi was developed by Prabhu Ramachandran, is free and distributed under the BSD License. It is cross-platform and runs on any platform where both Python and VTK are available (almost any Unix, Mac OS X, or Windows). MayaVi is pronounced as a single name, "Ma-ya-vee", meaning "magical" in Sanskrit. The code of MayaVi has nothing in common with that of Autodesk Maya or the Vi text editor.

The latest version of MayaVi, called Mayavi2, is a component of the Enthought suite of scientific Python programs. It differs from the original MayaVi by its strong focus on making an interactive program and a reusable component for 3D plotting in Python. Although it exposes a slightly different interface and API than the original MayaVi, it now has more features.

== Major features ==
- visualizes computational grids and scalar, vector, and tensor data
- an easy-to-use GUI
- can be imported as a Python module from other Python programs or can be scripted from the Python interpreter
- supports volume visualization of data via texture and ray cast mappers
- support for any VTK dataset using the VTK data format
- support for PLOT3D data
- multiple datasets can be used simultaneously
- provides a pipeline browser, with which objects in the VTK pipeline can be browsed and edited
- imports simple VRML and 3D Studio scenes
- custom modules and data filters can be added
- exporting to PostScript files, PPM/BMP/TIFF/JPEG/PNG images, Open Inventor, Geomview OOGL, VRML files, Wavefront .obj files, or RenderMan RIB file

== Examples ==
=== Spherical harmonics ===
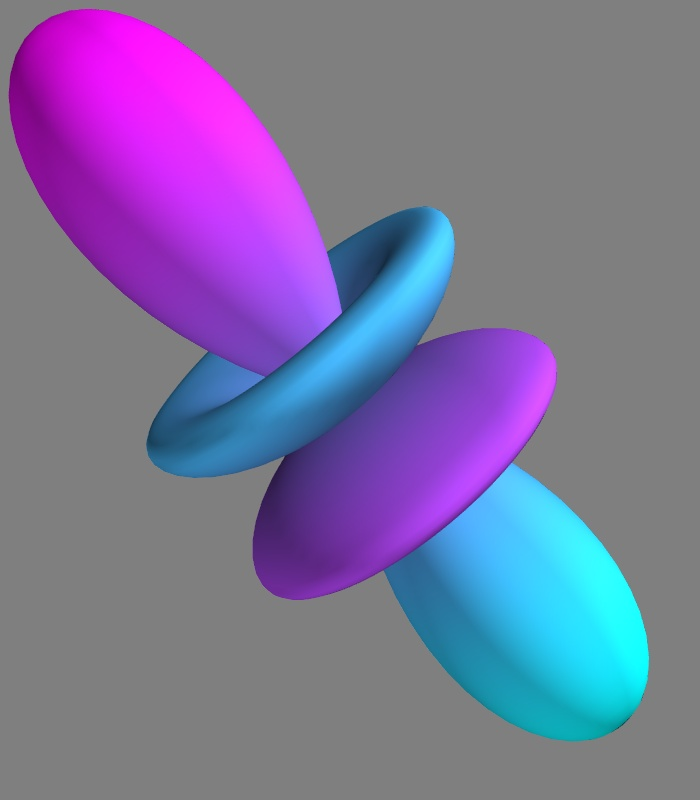
The spherical harmonic function $Y_3^0 (\theta, \varphi )$

from numpy import linspace, meshgrid, array, sin, cos, pi, abs
from scipy.special import sph_harm
from mayavi import mlab

theta_1d = linspace(0, pi, 91)
phi_1d = linspace(0, 2 * pi, 181)

theta_2d, phi_2d = meshgrid(theta_1d, phi_1d)
xyz_2d = array(
    [sin(theta_2d) * sin(phi_2d), sin(theta_2d) * cos(phi_2d), cos(theta_2d)]
)
l = 3
m = 0

Y_lm = sph_harm(m, l, phi_2d, theta_2d)
r = abs(Y_lm.real) * xyz_2d

mlab.figure(size=(700, 830))
mlab.mesh(r[0], r[1], r[2], scalars=Y_lm.real, colormap="cool")
mlab.view(azimuth=0, elevation=75, distance=2.4, roll=-50)
mlab.savefig("Y_%i_%i.jpg" % (l, m))
mlab.show()
