= Travis Oliphant =

American data scientist

- Born: 1971 (age 54–55); Salt Lake City, Utah
- Education: PhD in Biomedical Engineering, B.S. and M.S. degrees in Mathematics and Electrical Engineering
- Alma mater: Brigham Young University
- Occupations: Businessman, data scientist
- Known for: Open-source software, NumPy, SciPy, Anaconda (Python distribution), Probabilistic programming, OpenTeams

Travis Oliphant is an American data scientist, software developer, and entrepreneur known for his work in Python scientific computing ecosystem. He is the primary creator of Numpy. He is also a founder of Anaconda, Quansight, and OpenTeams.

== Early life and education ==
Oliphant earned a Bachelor of Science and a Master of Science in mathematics and electrical engineering from Brigham Young University. He later completed a Ph.D. in Biomedical Engineering at the Mayo Clinic, where his research focused on medical imaging and signal processing.

== Career ==
=== Academic career ===
From 2001 to 2007, Oliphant served as an assistant professor in the Department of Electrical and Computer Engineering at Brigham Young University. During his tenure, he directed the Biomedical Imaging Lab, where his research centered on scanning impedance imaging and other computational imaging techniques.

=== Professional career ===
From 2007 to 2011, Oliphant was president of Enthought, a scientific computing company. In 2012, he co-founded Continuum Analytics (renamed Anaconda Inc. in 2017), where he served as CEO until 2017. The company developed the Anaconda distribution, a widely used platform for managing Python environments and data science tools.

After departing Anaconda in 2017, Oliphant founded Quansight, a services and consulting firm focused on supporting open source technologies in enterprise settings. In 2019, he launched OpenTeams, a platform aimed at helping companies build and manage open-source-based AI infrastructure. As of 2025, he serves as its president. Oliphant serves on the Board of Directors of OSS Risk Guard, Inc.

In 2025, OpenTeams acquired the AI consulting division of Quansight, including its core engineering team. As part of the transition, former Quansight CTO Dharhas Pothina joined OpenTeams as its new CTO.

In February 2025, Oliphant co-founded the Open Source AI Foundation (O-SAIF) alongside Brittany Kaiser, known for her role in the Cambridge Analytica case, and former Wyoming legislator Tyler Lindholm.

== Works ==
In 2005, Oliphant created NumPy, which unified earlier numerical libraries such as Numeric and numarray. NumPy has since become a core component of the Python ecosystem, widely used in scientific computing, machine learning, and data science. He also contributed to the development of SciPy, expanding Python's capabilities for applied mathematics, signal processing, and statistical analysis.

In 2012, Oliphant co-founded NumFOCUS, a nonprofit that supports the open-source scientific computing community. He remains active on its advisory board. In 2012, he co-founded Continuum Analytics (renamed Anaconda Inc. in 2017), where he served as CEO until 2017.

Under Oliphant's leadership, Continuum Analytics raised $24 million in Series A funding in 2015 and received funding from DARPA to develop GPU-accelerated extensions to Python for high-performance computing.

== Selected publications ==
=== Articles ===
- Travis E. Oliphant (2007). "Python for Scientific Computing". Computing in Science & Engineering. 9 (3): 10–20. doi:10.1109/MCSE.2007.58. ISSN 1521-9615. Wikidata Q62058750.
- Pauli Virtanen; Ralf Gommers; Travis E. Oliphant; et al. (23 July 2019). "SciPy 1.0: fundamental algorithms for scientific computing in Python" (PDF). Nature Methods. 17 (3): 261–272. arXiv:1907.10121. doi:10.1038/S41592-019-0686-2. ISSN 1548-7091. PMC 7056644. PMID 32015543. Wikidata Q84573952. (erratum)
- Charles R Harris; K. Jarrod Millman; Stéfan J. van der Walt; et al. (16 September 2020). "Array programming with NumPy" (PDF). Nature. 585 (7825): 357–362. arXiv:2006.10256. Bibcode:2020Natur.585..357H. doi:10.1038/S41586-020-2649-2. ISSN 1476-4687. PMC 7759461. PMID 32939066. Wikidata Q99413970.

== See also ==
- Python (programming language)
- NumPy
- SciPy
- Anaconda (Python distribution)
- Open source software
