= Wes McKinney =

American software developer and businessman

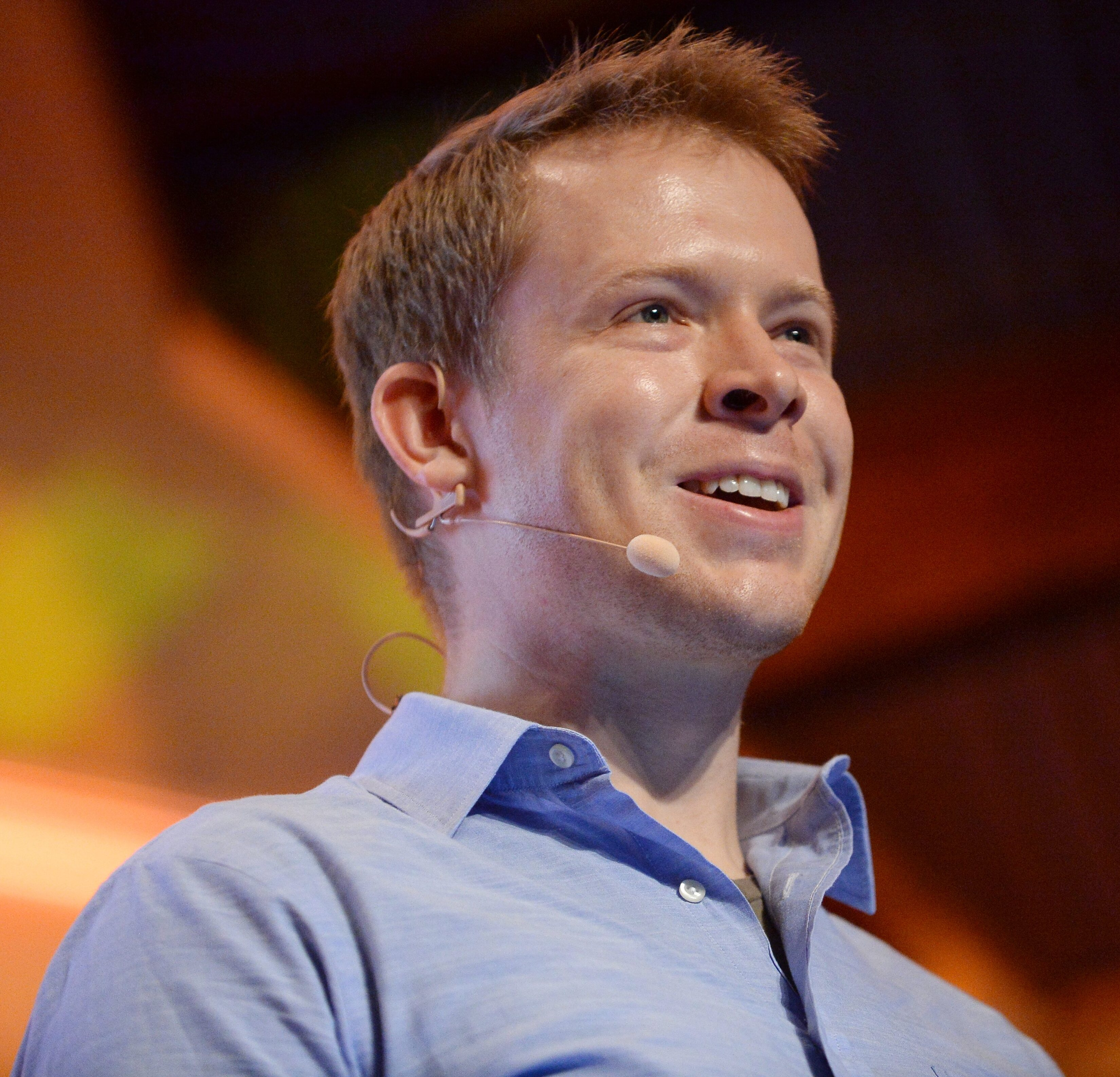
- McKinney in 2015
- Education: Massachusetts Institute of Technology (BS); Duke University (PhD)
- Occupations: Software developer; Businessman
- Known for: Creator of pandas
- Website: wesmckinney.com

Wes McKinney is an American software developer and businessman. He is the creator and "Benevolent Dictator for Life" (BDFL) of the open-source pandas package for data analysis in the Python programming language, and has also authored three versions of the reference book Python for Data Analysis. He is also the creator of Apache Arrow, a cross-language development platform for in-memory data, and Ibis, a unified Python dataframe API. He was the CEO and founder of technology startup Datapad. He was a software engineer at Two Sigma Investments. He founded Ursa Labs, which, in 2021, became part of Voltron Data. In 2022, it was announced that Voltron Data had raised $110 million.

== Early life and education ==
In 2007, McKinney graduated from Massachusetts Institute of Technology with a BS in Mathematics.

In 2010, McKinney began a PhD program in Statistics at Duke University. He went on leave a year later to focus on his professional projects.

== Career ==
From 2007 to 2010, McKinney researched global macro and credit trading strategies at AQR Capital Management. During his time at AQR Capital, he learned Python and started building what would become pandas. McKinney made the pandas project public in 2009.

McKinney left AQR in 2010 to start a PhD in Statistics at Duke University. He went on leave from Duke in the summer of 2011 to devote more time to developing Pandas, culminating in the writing of Python for Data Analysis in 2012.

In 2012, he co-founded Lambda Foundry Inc.

McKinney co-founded Datapad with Chang She in January 2013, with McKinney as CEO. Datapad developed a data visualization product also on the Python stack targeting enterprise customers. Datapad was acquired by Cloudera in September 2014. McKinney joined the engineering team at Cloudera following the acquisition. He worked on an open-source project called Ibis, incubated within Cloudera Labs, aiming at using Python for big data problems. In 2016, McKinney joined the investment fund Two Sigma Investments to work on Apache Arrow. In 2018, he launched Ursa Labs. In 2023, he joined Posit (formerly RStudio) as a Principal Architect.

=== Media coverage ===
McKinney has been interviewed by VentureBeat and others. He frequently gives talks to the Python community.
