= Anaconda (software company) =

Python distribution

- Developers: Anaconda, Inc. (previously Continuum Analytics)
- Release: 0.8.0 / 17 July 2012; 14 years ago
- Stable release: 2025.06-1 / 23 June 2025; 16 months ago
- Written in: Python
- Operating system: Windows, macOS, Linux
- Type: Programming language, machine learning, data science
- License: Freemium (The Individual Edition is freeware, but the other editions are software as a service)

Anaconda is an open source data science and artificial intelligence development portal and a distribution platform for the Python programming language. Developed by Anaconda, Inc., an American company founded in 2012, the platform is used to develop and manage data science and AI projects. In 2024, Anaconda Inc. has about 300 employees and 50 million users.

== History ==
Co-founded in Austin, Texas in 2012 as Continuum Analytics by Peter Wang and Travis Oliphant, Anaconda Inc. operates from the United States and Europe.

Anaconda Inc. developed Conda, a cross-platform, language-agnostic binary package manager. It also launched PyData community workshops and the Jupyter Cloud Notebook service (Wakari.io). In 2013, it received funding from DARPA. In 2015, the company had two million users including 200 of the Fortune 500 companies and raised $24 million in a Series A funding round led by General Catalyst and BuildGroup. Anaconda secured an additional $30 million in funding in 2021.

Continuum Analytics rebranded as Anaconda in 2017. That year, it announced the release of Anaconda Enterprise 5, an integration with Microsoft Azure, and had over 13 million users by year's end.

In 2022, the company released Anaconda Business, new integrations with Snowflake and others, and the open-source PyScript. It also acquired PythonAnywhere, while Anaconda's user base exceeded 30 million in 2022. In 2023, Anaconda released Python in Excel, a new integration with Microsoft Excel, and launched PyScript.com.

The company made a series of investments in AI during 2024. That February, Anaconda partnered with IBM to import its repository of Python packages into Watsonx, IBM's generative AI platform. The same year, Anaconda joined IBM's AI Alliance and released an integration with Teradata and Lenovo.

In 2024, Anaconda's user base reached 45 million users and Barry Libert was named company CEO, after serving on Anaconda's board of directors. He was succeeded as CEO in October 2025 by David DeSanto, who also became a company director.

In May 2025, the company introduced the first unified AI platform for Open Source, Anaconda AI Platform, a central control for AI workflows that enables customization in Python-based enterprise AI development. That July, after reaching over $150 million in a Series C funding round, Anaconda was evaluated at about $1.5 billion.

In April 2026, Anaconda acquired Outerbounds, the company behind open source AI/ML orchestration framework Metaflow. That July, the company acquired Kilo Code, an open-source AI coding agent runs via a command-line interface integrated across IDE extensions that is used by over three million developers. The company acquired AI security and compliance firm Enkrypt AI the following month. That summer, data reported over 50 million users of the platform.

== Overview ==
Anaconda distribution comes with over 300 packages automatically installed, and over 7,500 additional open-source packages can be installed from the Anaconda repository as well as the Conda package and virtual environment manager. It also includes a GUI, Anaconda Navigator, as a graphical alternative to the command-line interface (CLI).

Conda was developed to address dependency conflicts native to the pip package manager, which would automatically install any dependent Python packages without checking for conflicts with previously installed packages (until its version 20.3, which later implemented consistent dependency resolution). The Conda package manager's historical differentiation analyzed and resolved these installation conflicts.

Anaconda is a distribution of the Python programming language (and previously also R) for scientific computing (data science, machine learning applications, large-scale data processing, predictive analytics, etc.), that aims to simplify package management and deployment. Anaconda distribution includes data-science packages suitable for Windows, Linux, and macOS. Other company products include Anaconda Free, and subscription-based Starter, Business and Enterprise. Anaconda's business tier offers Package Security Manager.

Package versions in Anaconda are managed by the package management system Conda, which was spun out as a separate open-source package as useful both independently and for applications other than Python. There is also a small, bootstrap version of Anaconda called Miniconda, which includes only Conda, Python, the packages they depend on, and a small number of other packages.

Open source packages can be individually installed from the Anaconda repository, Anaconda Cloud (anaconda.org), or the user's own private repository or mirror, using the conda install command. Anaconda, Inc. compiles and builds the packages available in the Anaconda repository itself, and provides binaries for Windows 32/64 bit, Linux 64 bit and MacOS 64-bit (Intel, Apple Silicon). Anything available on PyPI may be installed into a Conda environment using pip, and Conda will keep track of what it has installed and what pip has installed. Custom packages can be made using the conda build command, and can be shared with others by uploading them to Anaconda Cloud, PyPI or other repositories.

The default installation of Anaconda2 includes Python 2.7 and Anaconda3 includes Python 3.7. However, it is possible to create new environments that include any version of Python packaged with Conda.

=== Anaconda Navigator ===
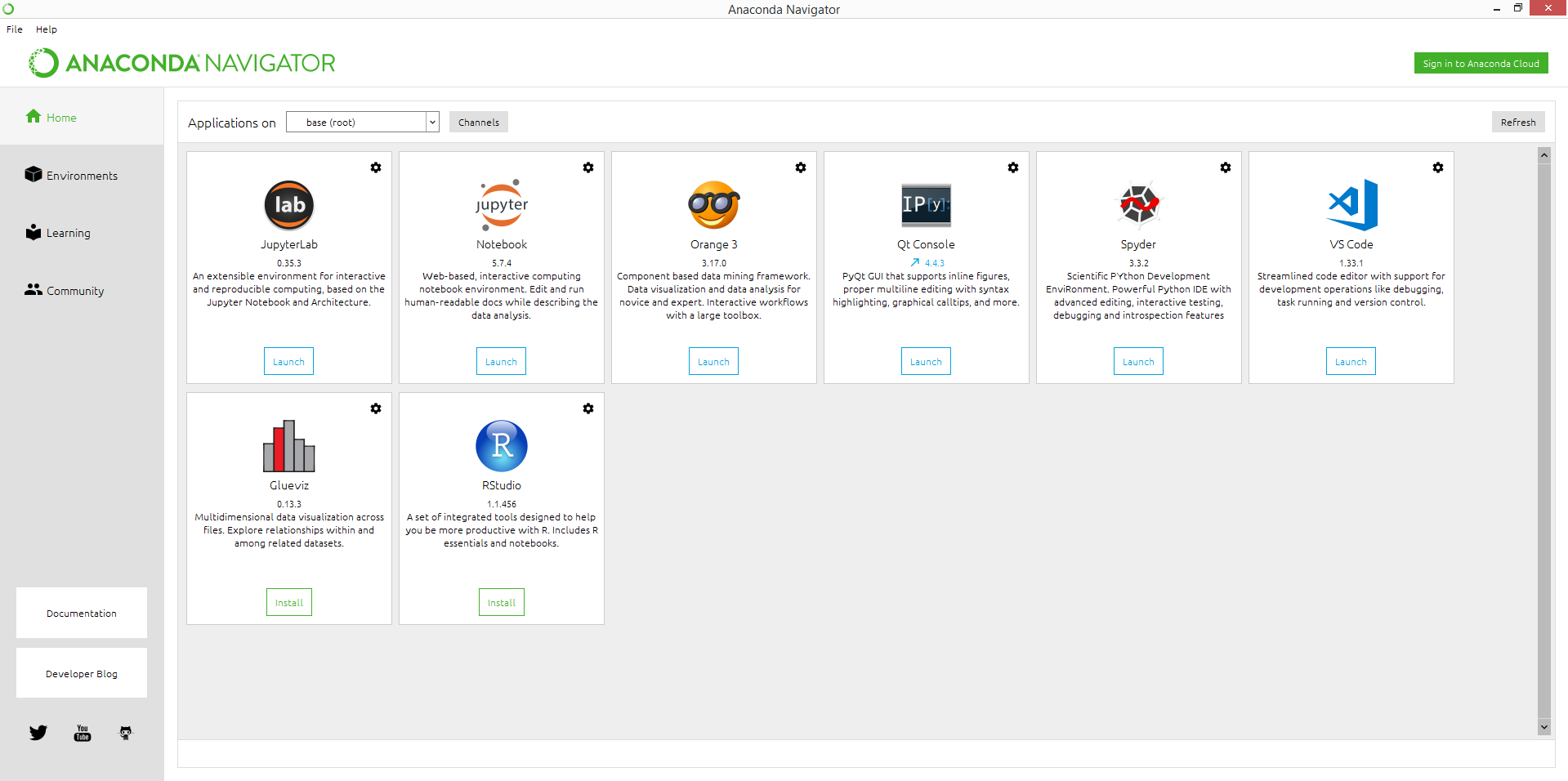
Anaconda Navigator

Anaconda Navigator is a desktop graphical user interface (GUI) included in Anaconda distribution that allows users to launch applications and manage Conda packages, environments and channels without using command-line commands. Navigator can search for packages on Anaconda Cloud or in a local Anaconda Repository, install them in an environment, run the packages and update them. It is available for Windows, macOS and Linux.

The following applications are available by default in Navigator:

- JupyterLab
- Jupyter Notebook
- QtConsole
- Spyder
- Glue
- Orange
- RStudio
- Visual Studio Code

=== Conda ===
Conda is an open source, cross-platform, language-agnostic package manager and environment management system that installs, runs, and updates packages and their dependencies. It was created for Python programs, but it can package and distribute software for any language, including multi-language projects. The Conda package and environment manager is included in all versions of Anaconda, Miniconda, and Anaconda Repository.

== Anaconda.org ==
Anaconda Cloud is a package management service by Anaconda where users can find, access, store and share public and private notebooks, environments, and Conda and PyPI packages. Cloud hosts useful Python packages, notebooks and environments for a wide variety of applications. Users do not need to log in or to have a Cloud account, to search for public packages, download and install them. Users can build new Conda packages using Conda-build and then use the Anaconda Client CLI to upload packages to Anaconda.org. Notebooks users can be aided with writing and debugging code with Anaconda's AI Assistant.

== See also ==
- List of software package management systems
