= Project Jupyter =

Open source data science software

- Abbreviation: Jupyter
- Formation: July 2014; 12 years ago
- Type: Nonprofit organization
- Region served: Worldwide
- Official language: English
- Website: jupyter.org

Project Jupyter (pronounced "Jupiter") is a project to develop open-source software, open standards, and services for interactive computing across multiple programming languages.

It was spun off from IPython in 2014 by its Seven Founding Members: Fernando Pérez, Brian Granger, Damian Avila, Kyle Kelley, Matthias Bussonnier, Min Ragan-Kelley, and Thomas Kluyver. Project Jupyter's name is a reference to the three core programming languages supported by Jupyter, which are Julia, Python and R. Its name and logo are an homage to Galileo's discovery of the moons of Jupiter, as documented in notebooks attributed to Galileo.

Jupyter is financially sponsored by the Jupyter Foundation.

== History ==
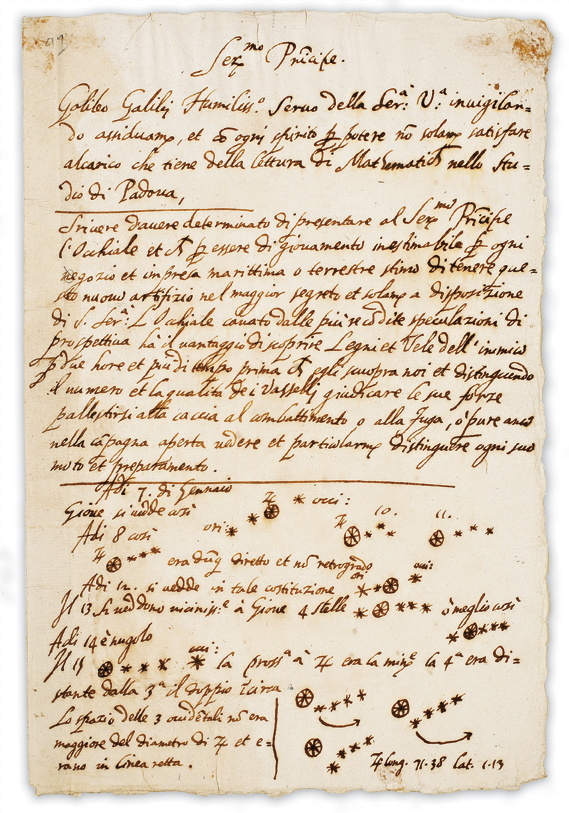
A manuscript (incorrectly) ascribed to Galileo Galilei's observations of Jupiter (⊛) and four of its moons (✱), which inspired the Jupyter logo

The first version of Notebooks for IPython was released in 2011 by a team including Fernando Pérez, Brian Granger, and Min Ragan-Kelley. In 2014, Pérez announced a spin-off project from IPython called Project Jupyter. IPython continues to exist as a Python shell and a kernel for Jupyter, while the notebook and other language-agnostic parts of IPython moved under the Jupyter name. Jupyter supports execution environments (called "kernels") in several dozen languages, including Julia, R, Haskell, Ruby, and Python (via the IPython kernel).

In 2015, about 200,000 Jupyter notebooks were available on GitHub. By 2018, about 2.5 million were available. In January 2021, nearly 10 million were available, including notebooks about the first observation of gravitational waves and about the 2019 discovery of a supermassive black hole.

Major cloud computing providers have adopted the Jupyter Notebook or derivative tools as a frontend interface for cloud users. Examples include Amazon SageMaker Notebooks, Google's Colab, and Microsoft's Azure Notebook.

Visual Studio Code supports local development of Jupyter notebooks. As of July 2022, the Jupyter extension for VS Code has been downloaded over 40 million times, making it the second-most popular extension in the VS Code Marketplace.

Members of the Project Jupyter steering committee — Fernando Pérez, Brian E. Granger, Min Ragan-Kelley, Paul Ivanov, Thomas Kluyver, Jason Grout, Matthias Bussonnier, Damián Avila, Steven Silvester, Jonathan Frederic, Kyle Kelley, Jessica Hamrick, Carol Willing, Sylvain Corlay, and Peter Parente — received the 2017 ACM Software System Award, an annual award that honors people or an organization "for developing a software system that has had a lasting influence, reflected in contributions to concepts, in commercial acceptance, or both".

The Atlantic published an article entitled "The Scientific Paper Is Obsolete" in 2018, discussing the role of Jupyter Notebook and the Mathematica notebook in the future of scientific publishing. Economist Paul Romer, in response, published a blog post in which he reflected on his experiences using Mathematica and Jupyter for research, concluding in part that Jupyter "does a better job of delivering what Theodore Gray had in mind when he designed the Mathematica notebook."

In 2021, Nature named Jupyter as one of ten computing projects that transformed science.

== Jupyter Notebook ==
Jupyter Notebook
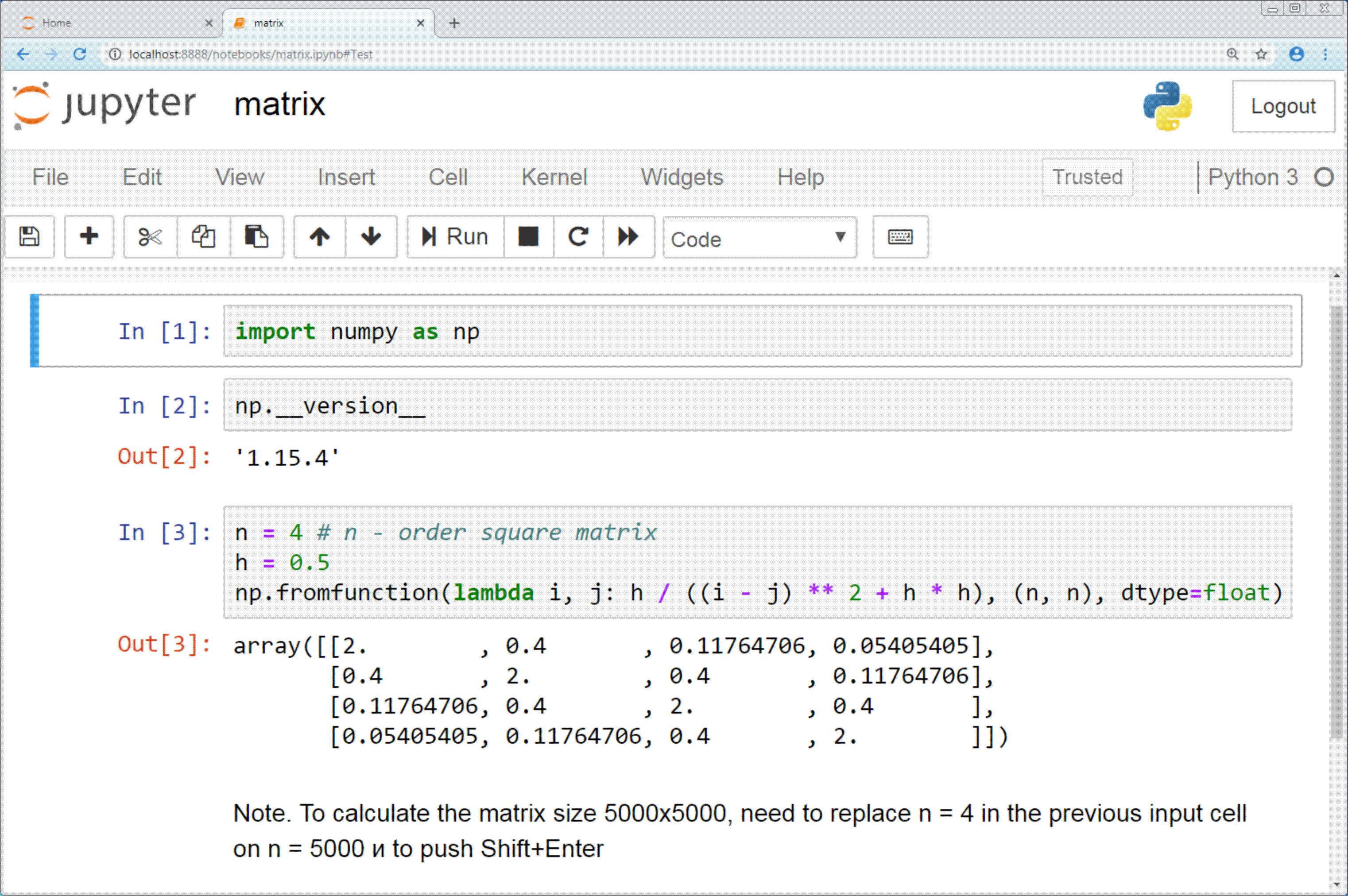
- Screenshot showing a widget to calculate the matrix
- Developer: Project Jupyter
- Stable release: 7.6.2 / 11 August 2026; 40 days ago
- License: 3-clause BSD license
- Website: jupyter.org
- Repository: github.com/jupyter/notebook

Jupyter Notebook can colloquially refer to two different concepts, either the user-facing application to edit code and text, or the underlying file format which is interoperable across many implementations.

=== Applications ===
Jupyter Notebook (formerly IPython Notebook) is a web-based interactive computational environment for creating notebook documents. Jupyter Notebook is built using several open-source libraries, including IPython, ZeroMQ, Tornado, jQuery, Bootstrap, and MathJax. A Jupyter Notebook application is a browser-based REPL containing an ordered list of input/output cells which can contain code, text (using GitHub Flavored Markdown), mathematics, plots and rich media.

Jupyter Notebook is similar to the notebook interface of other programs such as Maple, Mathematica, and SageMath, a computational interface style that originated with Mathematica in the 1980s. Jupyter interest overtook the popularity of the Mathematica notebook interface in early 2018.

JupyterLab is a newer user interface for Project Jupyter, offering a flexible user interface and more features than the classic notebook UI. The first stable release was announced on February 20, 2018. In 2015, a joint $6 million grant from The Leona M. and Harry B. Helmsley Charitable Trust, The Gordon and Betty Moore Foundation, and The Alfred P. Sloan Foundation funded work that led to expanded capabilities of the core Jupyter tools, as well as to the creation of JupyterLab.

GitHub announced in November 2022 that JupyterLab would be available in its online Coding platform called Codespace.

In August 2023, Jupyter AI, a Jupyter extension, was released. This extension incorporates generative AI into Jupyter notebooks, enabling users to explain and generate code, rectify errors, summarize content, inquire about their local files, and generate complete notebooks based on natural language prompts.

JupyterHub is a multi-user server for Jupyter Notebooks. It is designed to support many users by spawning, managing, and proxying many singular Jupyter Notebook servers.

=== Documents ===
A Jupyter Notebook document is a JSON file, following a versioned schema, usually ending with the ".ipynb" extension. The main parts of the Jupyter Notebooks are: Metadata, Notebook format and list of cells. Metadata is a data Dictionary of definitions to set up and display the notebook. Notebook Format is a version number of the software. List of cells are different types of Cells for Markdown (display), Code (to execute), and output of the code type cells.

While JSON is the most common format, it is possible to forgo some features (like storing images and metadata), and save notebooks as markdown documents using extensions like Jupytext. Jupytext is often used in conjunction with version control to make diffing and merging of notebooks simpler.

== See also ==
- Binder Project
- GNU Data Language
- GNU Octave – Numerical analysis programming language
- List of online integrated development environments
- List of notebook interfaces
- RStudio – Integrated development environment for R
- Scilab – Open-source numerical computation software
- Spyder (software) – IDE for scientific programming in Python
- Google Colab – O-IDE Jupyter notebook environment with free access to GPUs and TPUs for machine learning and deep learning development
