= Numba =

JIT compiler for Python

- Numba logo
- Original author: Continuum Analytics
- Developer: Community project
- Release: 15 August 2012; 14 years ago
- Stable release: 0.68.0 / 30 September 2026; 9 days ago
- Written in: Python, C
- Operating system: Cross-platform
- Platform: x86-64, ARM64, POWER
- Type: Technical computing
- License: BSD 2-clause
- Website: numba.pydata.org
- Repository: github.com/numba/numba

Numba CUDA
- Developer: NVIDIA
- Stable release: 0.30.4 / July 2, 2026; 3 months ago
- Platform: NVIDIA GPU
- License: BSD 2-clause
- Website: nvidia.github.io/numba-cuda/
- Repository: github.com/NVIDIA/numba-cuda

Numba is an open-source JIT compiler that translates a subset of Python and NumPy into fast machine code using LLVM, via the llvmlite Python package. It offers a range of options for parallelising Python code for CPUs and GPUs, often with only minor code changes.

Numba was started by Travis Oliphant in 2012 and has since been under active development with frequent releases. The project is driven by developers at Anaconda, Inc., with support by DARPA, the Gordon and Betty Moore Foundation, Intel, Nvidia and AMD, and a community of contributors on GitHub.

== Example ==
Numba can be used by simply applying the numba.jit decorator to a Python function that does numerical computations:

import numba
import random

@numba.jit
def monte_carlo_pi(n_samples: int) -> float:
    """Monte Carlo"""
    acc = 0
    for i in range(n_samples):
        x = random.random()
        y = random.random()
        if (x**2 + y**2) < 1.0:
            acc += 1
    return 4.0 * acc / n_samples

The just-in-time compilation happens transparently when the function is called:

>>> monte_carlo_pi(1000000)
3.14

== GPU support ==
Numba can compile Python functions to GPU code. Initially two backends are available:

- NVIDIA CUDA, see numba.readthedocs.io/en/stable/cuda/index.html
- AMD ROCm HSA, see numba.pydata.org/numba-doc/dev/roc

Since release 0.56.4, AMD ROCm HSA has been officially moved to unmaintained status and a separate repository stub has been created for it.

== Alternative approaches ==
Numba is one approach to make Python fast, by compiling specific functions that contain Python and NumPy code. Many alternative approaches for fast numeric computing with Python exist, such as Cython, Pythran, and PyPy.
