= PythonAnywhere =

Online IDE and web hosting service

- Original authors: Giles Thomas; Robert Smithson
- Developers: Anaconda, Inc
- Written in: Python
- Operating system: Cross-platform; HTML5
- Type: Integrated development environment; Web hosting service
- License: Proprietary
- Website: www.pythonanywhere.com

PythonAnywhere is an online integrated development environment (IDE) and web hosting service (Platform as a service) based on the Python programming language. Founded by Giles Thomas and Robert Smithson in 2012, it provides in-browser access to server-based Python and Bash command-line interfaces, along with a code editor with syntax highlighting. Program files can be transferred to and from the service using the user's browser. Web applications hosted by the service can be written using any WSGI-based application framework.

PythonAnywhere was created by Resolver Systems, who also produced Resolver One, a Python-based Spreadsheet program. On 16 October 2012 the product was acquired by a new company, PythonAnywhere LLP, who took on the existing development team. In June, 2022, PythonAnywhere was acquired by Anaconda, Inc.

The development team uses PythonAnywhere to develop PythonAnywhere, and say that its collaboration features help because they use the extreme programming methodology.

== Features ==
- CPython, PyPy and IPython support, including Python versions 3.9, 3.10, 3.11, 3.12 and 3.13 (plus some older deprecated versions).
- In-browser interactive consoles with code running on hosted servers, shareable between multiple users.
- WSGI-based web hosting, e.g. Django, Flask, web2py
- Support for coding from iPad and other mobile devices.
- Syntax-highlighting in-browser editor.
- Many popular Python modules pre-installed.
- Cron-like scheduled tasks to run scripts at a given time of day.
- Always-on tasks to run scripts and restart them automatically when they fail.

== Uses ==
PythonAnywhere is described as "the simplest way to deploy web2py applications" in the official book on the web framework, is suggested when learning NumPy, is deployment platform of choice in Django Girls tutorial, and is recommended as a way of hosting machine learning-based web applications.

PythonAnywhere is also used in education as a browser-based environment for teaching Python. Students can complete programming exercises without installing Python on their own computers, while teachers can assign tasks and access students' code files and consoles to provide guidance and assistance.

== See also ==
- Comparison of Python integrated development environments
- List of Python software
