= Alex Martelli =

Italian computer engineer (born 1955)

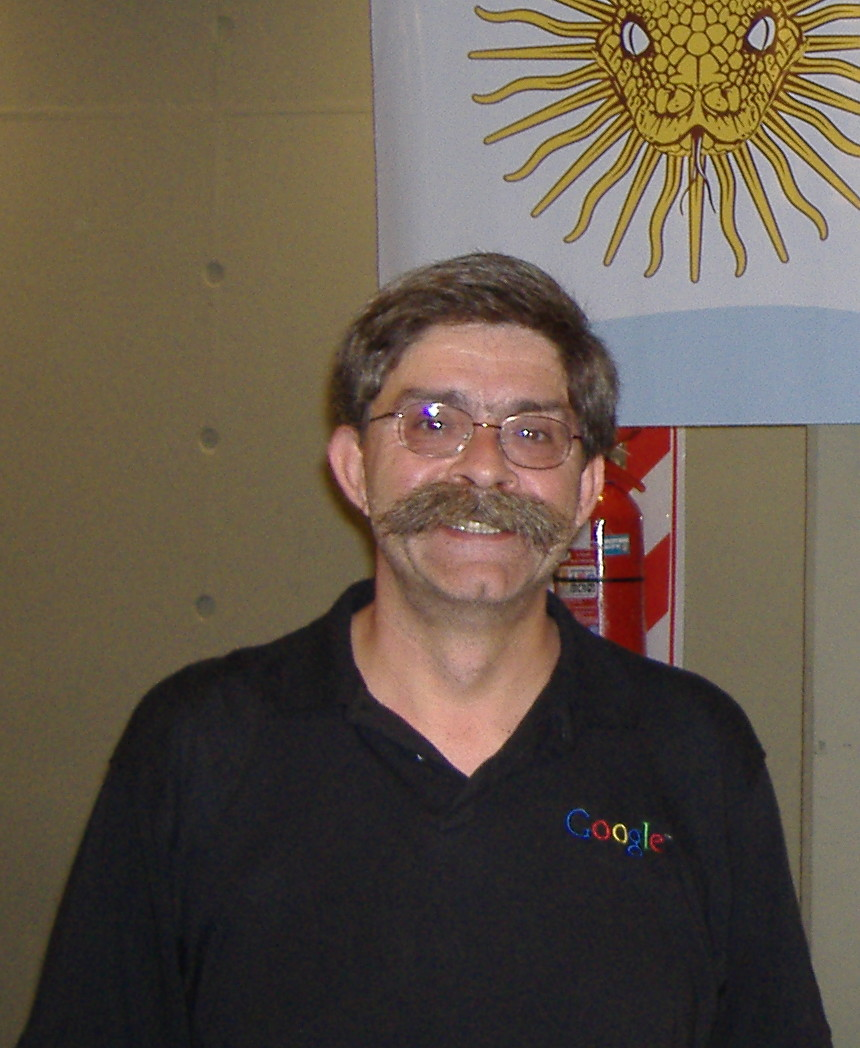
- Alex Martelli in Argentina (Cafeconf 2006)
- Born: October 5, 1955 (age 70)
- Occupation: computer engineer
- Known for: contributions to the Python community

Alex Martelli (born October 5, 1955) is an Italian computer engineer and Fellow of the Python Software Foundation. Since early 2005, he worked for Google, Inc. in Mountain View, California, for the first few years as "Über Tech Lead," then as "Senior Staff Engineer," lastly in charge of "long tail" community support for Google Cloud Platform. He retired in August, 2023.

He holds a Laurea in Electrical Engineering from Bologna University (1980); he is the author of Python in a Nutshell (recently out in a fourth edition, which Martelli wrote with three co-authors), co-editor of the Python Cookbook's first two editions, and has written other (mostly Python-related) materials. Martelli won the 2002 Activators' Choice Award, and the 2006 Frank Willison award for outstanding contributions to the Python community.

Before joining Google, Martelli spent a year designing integrated-circuit chips with Texas Instruments; eight years with IBM Research, gradually shifting from hardware to software, and winning three Outstanding Technical Achievement Awards; 12 as Senior Software Consultant at think3, Inc., developing libraries, network protocols, GUI engines, event frameworks, and web access frontends; and three more as a freelance consultant, working mostly for Open End AB, a Python-centered software house (formerly known as Strakt AB) located in Gothenburg, Sweden.

He has taught courses on programming, development methods, object-oriented design, cloud computing, and numerical computing, at Ferrara University and other schools. Martelli was also the keynote speaker for the 2008 SciPy Conference, and various editions of Pycon APAC and Pycon Italia conferences.

== Bibliography ==
- Martelli, Alex (July 2006). Python in a Nutshell. O'Reilly Media. ISBN 0-596-10046-9.
- Martelli, Alex; David Ascher; Anna Ravenscroft (March 2005). Python Cookbook. O'Reilly Media. ISBN 0-596-00797-3.

== External resources ==
- Much of Martelli's writing can be found at his personal home page.
- Introductory Lecture on Python on YouTube
- Stack Overflow profile
