= Naomi Ceder =

American software developer

- Website: www.naomiceder.tech

Naomi Ceder is an American software developer, author, and conference speaker. She is the author of the second, third and fourth editions of The Quick Python Book, and was the Chairperson of the Python Software Foundation from 2017 until 2020. Naomi is a self-described intersectional transfeminist, and often speaks about inclusion and diversity in technology.
