= Julia Stewart Lowndes =

Marine ecologist

Julia Stewart Lowndes is a marine ecologist and advocate for the open science movement and kinder, better science. The focus of her work is promoting openness to data in the scientific community, and helping fellow researchers learn how to work with open data and the processes surrounding it. She seeks to use this method to promote scientific communities and research.

== Career and experience ==
Julia Lowndes is the founder and co-director of Openscapes, a mentorship program that teaches researchers how to use data and code in their labs, work with open-source software, and network with peers in the same field. She also is an instructor for The Carpentries, as well as the co-founder of the groups Eco-Data-Science and R-Ladies Santa Barbara. Lowndes was a Mozilla Fellow. She has led the Ocean Health Index science program in the National Center for Ecological Analysis and Synthesis, where she currently works. Lowndes frequently speaks at conferences regarding the use of data in science and the promotion of open scientific communities, recently including SORTEE and Cascadia R Conference.

== Education ==
She received her PhD from Stanford University. Her dissertation, completed in 2012, was on the Humboldt squid; she observed the drivers and impact of the species with relation to the changing climate.
