= R-Ladies =

Organization promoting gender diversity in the R programming community

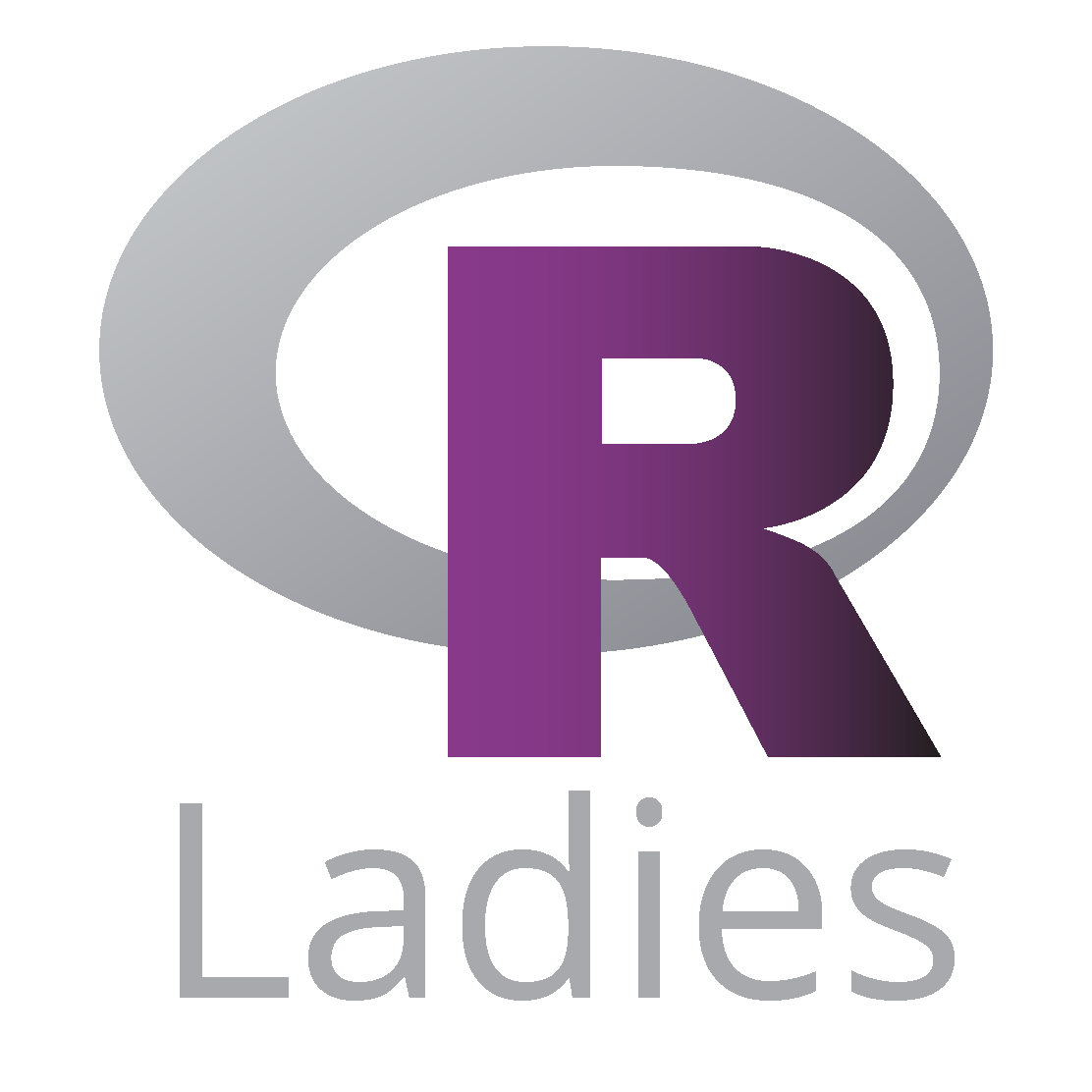
- Formation: 2016
- Type: organization
- Fields: computing, R, Women in STEM
- Website: rladies.org

R-Ladies is an organization that promotes gender diversity in the community of users of the R statistical programming language. It is made up of local chapters affiliated with the worldwide coordinating organization R-Ladies Global.

== History ==
On October 1, 2012, Gabriela de Queiroz, a data scientist, founded R-Ladies in San Francisco (United States) after participating in similar free initiatives through Meetup. In the following four years, three other groups started: Taipei in 2014, Minneapolis (called “Twin Cities”) in 2015, and London in 2016. The chapters were independent until the 2016 useR! Conference, where it was agreed to create a central coordinating organization. In that year, Gabriela de Queiroz and Erin LeDell of R-Ladies San Francisco; Chiin-Rui Tan, Alice Daish, Hannah Frick, Rachel Kirkham and Claudia Vitolo of R-Ladies London; as well as Heather Turner joined to apply for a grant from the R Consortium, with which they asked for support for the global expansion of the organization.

In September 2016, with this scholarship, R-Ladies Global was founded and in 2018 it was declared as a high-level project by the R Consortium. The current leadership team consists of Averi Giudicessi, Athanasia Monika Mowinckel, Shannon Pileggi, Riva Quiroga and Yanina Bellini Saibene. The leadership team has an overarching role in steering and directing the organization. It works closely together with more than 20 volunteers who take care of various areas such as campaigns, the directory, mentoring, public communications and social media, or the community Slack. As of 2024, the R-Ladies Global community consists of 219 groups in 63 countries.

== Organization ==
R-Ladies meetings are organized around workshops and talks, led by people that identify as female or as gender minorities (including but not limited to cis/trans women, trans men, non-binary, genderqueer, agender, pangender, two-spirt, gender-fluid, neutrois). The organization is coordinated by the Global Team. The chapters, however, operate decentralized and new chapters can be founded by anyone using the publicly available "starter-kit".

R-Ladies groups aim to promote a culture of inclusion within their events and community. In addition, they promote gender equality and diversity in conferences, in the workplace, collaboration among gender minorities, and analysis of data about women.

The Directory is a public directory listing 1,267 profiles of R-Ladies (in 2024). R-Ladies Global also showcases blogs written and maintained by their members.

R-Ladies also collaborates with other projects, such as NASA Datanauts or PyLadies.

== Gabriela de Queiroz ==
Gabriela de Queiroz
- Occupation: Director of AI at Microsoft
- Known for: R-Ladies, AI Inclusive

Academic background
- Education: Rio de Janeiro State University (Bachelor in Statistics); California State University, East Bay (Master in Statistics)
- Website: https://k-roz.com

Gabriela de Queiroz is the Director of AI at Microsoft and the founder of first R-Ladies chapter, AI Inclusive and co-founder of R-Ladies Global. Before, she also worked at IBM as a chief data scientist.

=== Early life and education ===
She was raised in Brazil and received her bachelor's degree in statistics from Rio de Janeiro State University. She has a master’s in epidemiology at Oswaldo Cruz Foundation and another one in statistics at California State University, East Bay. de Queiroz moved to the United States in 2012 to begin her master's degree in statistics at California State University, East Bay.

=== Achievements ===
Interested in creating an inclusive space for women learning the programming language R, she began a Meetup group in the San Francisco Bay area. Since then, the R-Ladies organization has grown to 219 groups in 63 countries.

In addition to her work with R-Ladies, de Queiroz is an expert in machine learning and led IBM's AI Strategy and Innovations team. Her team contributed to projects such as TensorFlow. de Queiroz was a finalist of the Women in Open Source Award by Red Hat in 2019, named 40 under 40 by CSUEB as well as listed among the 100 Brilliant Women in AI Ethics™ in 2023.

== Notable members ==
- Julia Stewart Lowndes – Marine ecologist
