= Python Conference =

Annual programming language convention

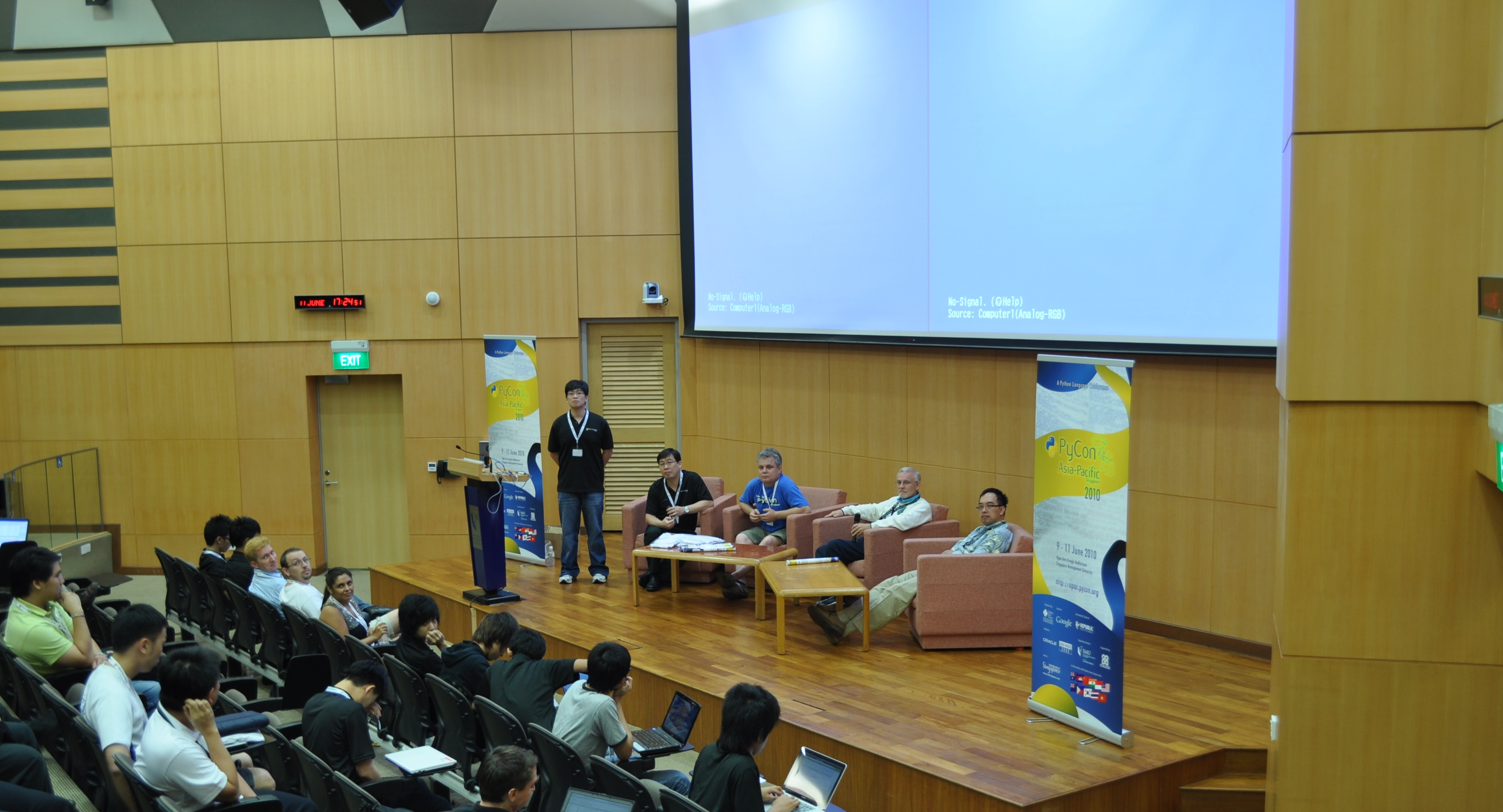
The closing panel of the 2010 PyCon Asia Pacific held at the Singapore Management University

The Python Conference (also called PyCon) is the largest annual convention for the discussion and promotion of the Python programming language. It originated in the United States but is also held in more than 40 other countries. It was one of the first computer programming conferences to develop and adhere to a code of conduct. The conference hosts tutorials, demonstrations and training sessions.

PyCon 2020 was listed as one of "The best software engineering conferences [to attend] of 2020" and "As Python becomes ever more popular in the scientific community and for big data, the influence of PyCon will continue to grow." PyCon is often attended by Guido van Rossum (the author of the Python language). Other groups, such as PyLadies and Django Girls, often have concurrent sessions.

It is sometimes referred to in software documentation and conference papers.

It is organised by the Python Software Foundation, and is supported by many significant companies, including Microsoft, Google, and Facebook.

== Location history ==
| Year | Location | Number of Attendees |
|---|---|---|
| 2003 | Washington, D.C. | 200 |
| 2004 | Washington, D.C. | 300 |
| 2005 | Washington, D.C. | 400 |
| 2006 | Dallas, Texas | 400 |
| 2007 | Dallas, Texas | 500 |
| 2008 | Chicago, Illinois | 1,000 |
| 2009 | Chicago, Illinois | 900 |
| 2010 | Atlanta, Georgia | 1,000 |
| 2011 | Atlanta, Georgia | 1,400 |
| 2012 | Santa Clara, California | 2,300 |
| 2013 | Santa Clara, California | 2,500 |
| 2014 | Montreal, Quebec (Canada) | 2,500 |
| 2015 | Montreal, Quebec (Canada) | 3,100 |
| 2016 | Portland, Oregon | 3,294 (badges issued) |
| 2017 | Portland, Oregon | 3,391 (badges received) |
| 2018 | Cleveland, Ohio | 3,260 (Checked-in people) |
| 2019 | Cleveland, Ohio | 3,393 (Checked-in people) |
| 2020 | ~~Pittsburgh, Pennsylvania~~ Virtual (online-only event due to the COVID-19 pandemic) | |
| 2021 | ~~Pittsburgh, Pennsylvania~~ Virtual (online-only event due to the COVID-19 pandemic) | 2,650 online |
| 2022 | Salt Lake City, Utah | 1,753 in-person + 669 online = 2,422 total |
| 2023 | Salt Lake City, Utah | 2,159 in-person + 491 online = 2,650 total |
| 2024 | Pittsburgh, Pennsylvania | 2,551 in-person + 440 online = 2,991 total |
| 2025 | Pittsburgh, Pennsylvania | 2,225 in-person |
| 2026 | Long Beach, California | 2003 in-person attendees, virtual not offered |
| 2027 | Long Beach, California | |
