= PyLadies =

Organization promoting gender diversity in the Python programming community

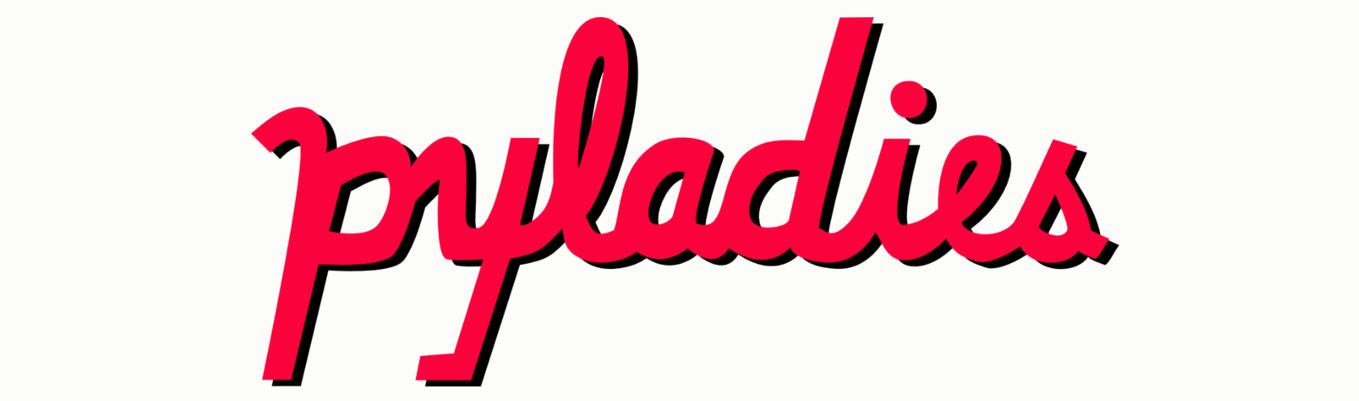
- PyLadies' logo
- Type: organization
- Fields: computing, Python (programming language), Women in STEM
- Website: pyladies.com

PyLadies is an international mentorship group which focuses on helping more women become active participants in the Python open-source community. It is part of the Python Software Foundation. It was started in Los Angeles in 2011. The mission of the group is to create a diverse Python community through outreach, education, conferences and social gatherings. PyLadies also provides funding for women to attend open source conferences. The aim of PyLadies is increasing the participation of women in computing. PyLadies became a multi-chapter organization with the founding of the Washington, D.C., chapter in August 2011.

== History ==
The organization was created in Los Angeles in April 2011 by seven women: Audrey Roy Greenfeld, Christine Cheung, Esther Nam, Jessica Venticinque (Stanton at the time), Katharine Jarmul, Sandy Strong, and Sophia Viklund. Around 2012, the organization filed for nonprofit status.

As of March 2024, PyLadies has 129 chapters.

== Organization ==
PyLadies has conducted outreach events for both beginners and experienced users. PyLadies has conducted hackathons, social nights and workshops for Python enthusiasts.

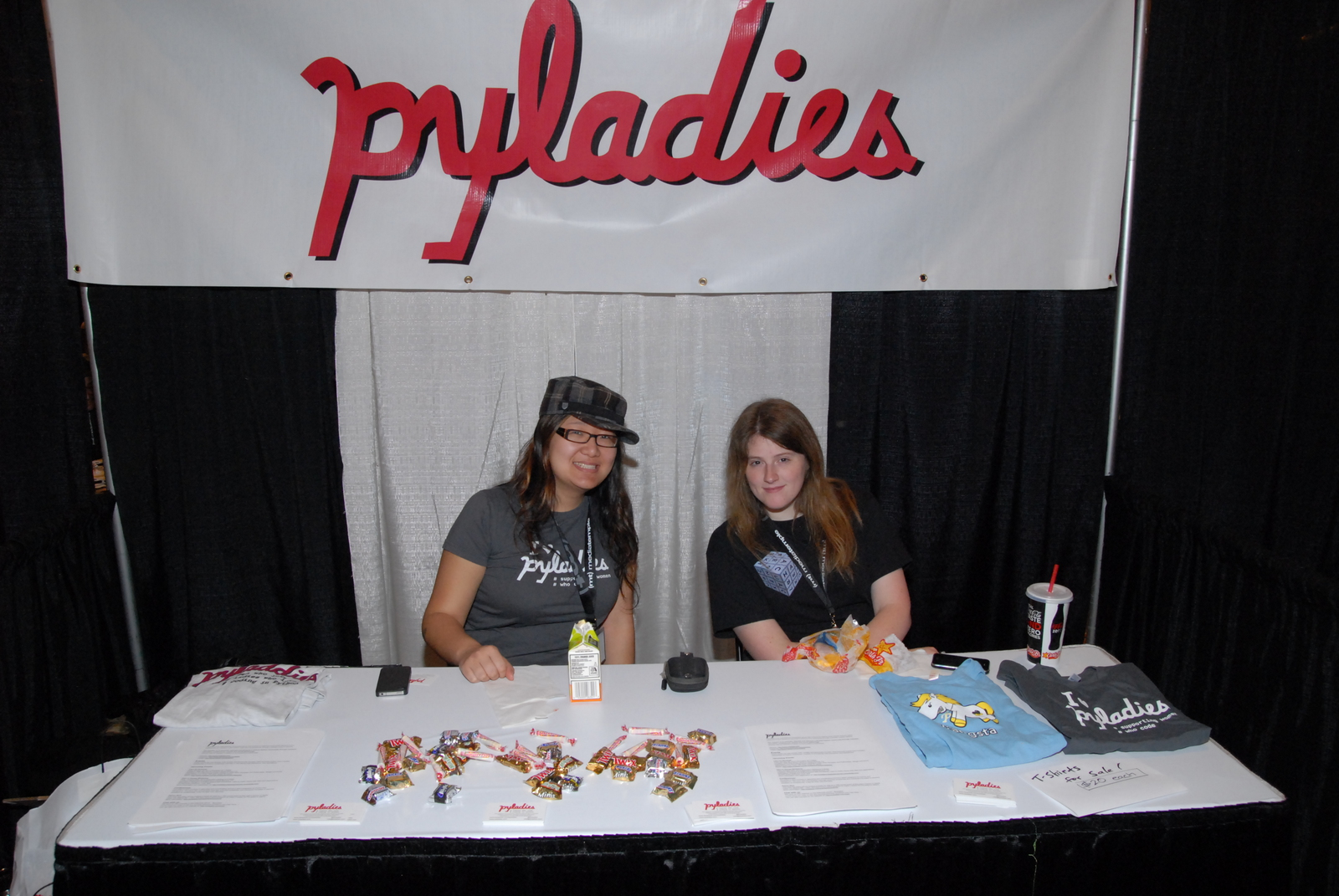
Participants at a PyLadies event

Each chapter is free to run themselves as they wish as long as they are focused on the goal of empowering women and other marginalized genders in tech. Women make up the majority of the group, but membership is not limited to women and the group is open to helping people who identify as other gender identities as well.

In the past, PyLadies has also collaborated with other organizations, for instance R-Ladies.
