= Run-time algorithm specialization =

In computer science, run-time algorithm specialization is a methodology for creating efficient algorithms for costly computation tasks of certain kinds. The methodology originates in the field of automated theorem proving and, more specifically, in the Vampire theorem prover project.

The idea is inspired by the use of partial evaluation in optimising program translation. Many core operations in theorem provers exhibit the following pattern. Suppose that we need to execute some algorithm $\mathit{alg}(A,B)$ in a situation where a value of $A$ is fixed for potentially many different values of $B$. In order to do this efficiently, we can try to find a specialization of $\mathit{alg}$ for every fixed $A$, i.e., such an algorithm $\mathit{alg}_A$, that executing $\mathit{alg}_A(B)$ is equivalent to executing $\mathit{alg}(A,B)$.

The specialized algorithm may be more efficient than the generic one, since it can exploit some particular properties of the fixed value $A$. Typically, $\mathit{alg}_A(B)$ can avoid some operations that $\mathit{alg}(A,B)$ would have to perform, if they are known to be redundant for this particular parameter $A$. In particular, we can often identify some tests that are true or false for $A$, unroll loops and recursion, etc.

== Difference from partial evaluation ==
The key difference between run-time specialization and partial evaluation is that the values of $A$ on which $\mathit{alg}$ is specialised are not known statically, so the specialization takes place at run-time.

There is also an important technical difference. Partial evaluation is applied to algorithms explicitly represented as codes in some programming language. At run-time, we do not need any concrete representation of $\mathit{alg}$. We only have to imagine $\mathit{alg}$ when we program the specialization procedure. All we need is a concrete representation of the specialized version $\mathit{alg}_A$. This also means that we cannot use any universal methods for specializing algorithms, which is usually the case with partial evaluation. Instead, we have to program a specialization procedure for every particular algorithm $\mathit{alg}$. An important advantage of doing so is that we can use some powerful ad hoc tricks exploiting peculiarities of $\mathit{alg}$ and the representation of $A$ and $B$, which are beyond the reach of any universal specialization methods.

== Specialization with compilation ==
The specialized algorithm has to be represented in a form that can be interpreted.

In many situations, usually when $\mathit{alg}_A(B)$ is to be computed on many values of $B$ in a row, $\mathit{alg}_A$ can be written as machine code instructions for a special abstract machine, and it is typically said that $A$ is compiled. The code itself can then be additionally optimized by answer-preserving transformations that rely only on the semantics of instructions of the abstract machine.

The instructions of the abstract machine can usually be represented as records. One field of such a record, an instruction identifier (or instruction tag), would identify the instruction type, e.g. an integer field may be used, with particular integer values corresponding to particular instructions. Other fields may be used for storing additional parameters of the instruction, e.g. a pointer field may point to another instruction representing a label, if the semantics of the instruction require a jump. All instructions of the code can be stored in a traversable data structure such as an array, linked list, or tree.

Interpretation (or execution) proceeds by fetching instructions in some order, identifying their type, and executing the actions associated with said type.

In many programming languages, such as C and C++, a simple switch statement may be used to associate actions with different instruction identifiers. Modern compilers usually compile a switch statement with constant (e.g. integer) labels from a narrow range by storing the address of the statement corresponding to a value $i$ in the $i$-th cell of a special array, as a means of efficient optimisation. This can be exploited by taking values for instruction identifiers from a small interval of values.

== Data-and-algorithm specialization ==
There are situations when many instances of $A$ are intended for long-term storage and the calls of $\mathit{alg}(A,B)$ occur with different $B$ in an unpredictable order. For example, we may have to check $\mathit{alg}(A_1,B_1)$ first, then $\mathit{alg}(A_2,B_2)$, then $\mathit{alg}(A_1,B_3)$, and so on. In such circumstances, full-scale specialization with compilation may not be suitable due to excessive memory usage. However, we can sometimes find a compact specialized representation $A^{\prime}$ for every $A$, that can be stored with, or instead of, $A$. We also define a variant $\mathit{alg}^{\prime}$ that works on this representation and any call to $\mathit{alg}(A,B)$ is replaced by $\mathit{alg}^{\prime}(A^{\prime},B)$, intended to do the same job faster.

== See also ==
- Psyco, a specializing run-time compiler for Python
- multi-stage programming
