= Unladen Swallow =

Branch of computer programming language

Unladen Swallow was an optimization branch of CPython, the reference implementation of the Python programming language, which incorporated a just-in-time compiler built using LLVM into CPython's virtual machine. Like many things regarding Python (and the name "Python" itself), "Unladen Swallow" is a Monty Python reference, specifically to the joke about the airspeed velocity of unladen swallows in Monty Python and the Holy Grail. The project's stated goals were to provide full compatibility with CPython specific code while quintupling its performance, and for the project to eventually be merged into CPython. Although it fell short of all its published goals, some Unladen Swallow code was added into the main Python implementation, such as improvements to the cPickle module.

Unladen Swallow was sponsored by Google, and the project owners, Thomas Wouters, Jeffrey Yasskin, and Collin Winter, were Google employees, though most project contributors were not. Unladen Swallow was hosted on Google Code.

In March 2010, a Python Enhancement Proposal (PEP) which proposed merging Unladen Swallow into a special py3k-jit branch of Python's official repository was accepted. However, its implementation was made difficult by Unladen being based on Python 2.6, with which Python 3 broke compatibility, and the PEP was subsequently withdrawn.

In July 2010, speculation began on whether the project was dead or dying since the 2009 Q4 milestone had not yet been released, and the traffic on Unladen's mailing list had decreased from 500 messages in January 2010 to fewer than 10 in September 2010. It had also been reported that Unladen had lost Google's funding, and in November 2010, Collin announced that "Jeffrey and I have been pulled on to other projects of higher importance to Google". By early 2011, it was clear that the project was stopped.

== Release history ==
- 2009 Q1
- 2009 Q2
- 2009 Q3: reduce memory use, improve speed

A 2009 Q4 development branch was created in January 2010, but was not advertised on the website, and its milestone was unmet.

== See also ==
- History of Python
- PyPy, another Python implementation with a JIT compiler
