= Python Software Foundation =

American nonprofit organization

- Abbreviation: PSF
- Formation: March 6, 2001; 25 years ago
- Type: 501(c)(3) nonprofit organization
- Headquarters: Wilmington, Delaware, United States
- Official language: English
- Founder: Guido van Rossum
- Chair: Jannis Leidel
- Executive Director: Deb Nicholson
- Revenue: $3.9 million (2022)
- Website: python.org/psf-landing

The Python Software Foundation (PSF) is an American nonprofit organization devoted to the Python programming language, launched on March 6, 2001. The mission of the foundation is to foster development of the Python community and is responsible for various processes within the Python community, including developing the core Python distribution, managing intellectual rights, developer conferences including the Python Conference (PyCon), and raising funds.

== History ==
In 2005, the Python Software Foundation received the Computerworld Horizon Award for "cutting-edge" technology.

In 2019, contributors to Python’s security program worked out of an office in Brooklyn, shared with Tor as part of the initiative to secure Python Package Index downloads with signed repository metadata via The Update Framework.

In 2025, the PSF attempted to obtain a $1.5 million grant from the National Science Foundation, but ultimately withdrew the application due to a requirement in the terms to refrain from diversity, equity, and inclusion activities. After the announcement, there was a surge of donations, with 295 new supporting members paying the $99/year membership fee in the first two weeks alone.

In January 2026, Anthropic donated $1.5 million to the PSF.

== Overview ==
The PSF focuses on empowering and supporting people within the Python community with grant programs that support sprints, conferences, meetups, user groups, and Python development. The PSF runs the Python Conference (PyCon) US, the leading Python community conference. The PSF is the primary point of contact for organizations that wish to work with Python, to support Python, or sponsor Python development. The PSF provides a structure by which work, donations, and sponsorships are coordinated worldwide. The PSF also possesses and protects intellectual property associated with Python and the Python community, such as the word "Python," the two-snakes logo, and the terms "PyLadies" and "PyCon."

== Membership ==
There are five tiers of membership within the PSF. These tiers include:

1. Basic members – Basic members are individuals or entities who are part of the Python language community and who have decided to declare their support for Python and agree to the community Code of Conduct.
2. Supporting members – Supporting members make an annual donation to the PSF to sustain the foundation and support the Python community. Supporting members are eligible to vote.
3. Managing members – Managing members are people who commit to working at least five hours per month to support the Python ecosystem, by organizing Python events, managing or contributing to PSF projects, running infrastructure, participating in one of the PSF's working groups, etc. Managing members are eligible to vote.
4. Contributing members – Contributing members are people who dedicate at least five hours per month working on projects that advance the mission of the PSF, where the work relates to the creation or maintenance of op-n source software available to the public at no charge. Contributing members are eligible to vote.
5. Fellows – Fellows are members who have been nominated by their extraordinary efforts and impact upon Python, the community, and the broader Python ecosystem. Fellows are nominated from the broader community and elevated by a vote of the members. Fellow members are eligible to vote.

== Code of conduct ==
Since late 2012, the Python Software Foundation started recommending that all Python conferences create and apply a code of conduct. This is mandatory to any event to be granted funds by the Python Software Foundation.

== See also ==
- PyLadies
- PyCon
