= List of CLI languages =

CLI languages are computer programming languages that are used to produce libraries and programs that conform to the Common Language Infrastructure (CLI) specifications. With some notable exceptions, most CLI languages compile entirely to the Common Intermediate Language (CIL), an intermediate language that can be executed using the Common Language Runtime, implemented by .NET Framework, .NET Core, and Mono. Some of these languages also require the Dynamic Language Runtime (DLR).

As the program is being executed, the CIL code is just-in-time compiled (and cached) to the machine code appropriate for the architecture on which the program is running. This step can be omitted manually by caching at an earlier stage using an "ahead of time" compiler such as Microsoft's ngen.exe and Mono's "-aot" option.

== Notable CLI languages ==
=== Current languages ===
Ada for .NET
Ada is a multi-paradigm language, that is strongly focused on code safety, maintainability and correctness.
Boo
A statically typed CLI language, inspired by Python.
C#
Most widely used CLI language, bearing strong similarities to Java, and some similarity to Object Pascal (Delphi) and C++. Implementations provided by .NET Framework, .NET Core, and Mono.
C++/CLI
A version of C++ including extensions for using Common Language Runtime (CLR) objects. Full support for .NET Framework and library only support for .NET Core. Produces mixed-mode code that produces native code for C++ objects. The compiler is by Microsoft.
ClojureCLR
A port of Clojure to the CLI; part of Clojure project.
Component Pascal
A CLI-compliant Oberon dialect. It is a strongly typed language in the heritage of Pascal and Modula-2 but with powerful object-oriented extensions.
Eiffel
Purely object-oriented language, focused on software quality, includes integrated design by contract and multiple inheritance. CLI compliant.
F#
A multi-paradigm CLI language supporting functional programming and imperative object-oriented programming disciplines. Variant of ML and is largely compatible with OCaml. Implementations provided by .NET Framework, .NET Core, and Mono.
F*
A dependently typed language based on F#.
Go
via the RemObjects Gold compiler & multi-platform targeting.
IronPython
An open-source CLI implementation of Python, built on the Dynamic Language Runtime (DLR).
IronScheme
A R6RS-compliant Scheme implementation built on the DLR
Java
via the RemObjects Iodine compiler & multi-platform targeting.
Oxygene
An Object Pascal-based CLI language.
PascalABC.NET
An Object Pascal-based language implemented on the .NET Framework.
PeachPie
A compiler of PHP to .NET and .NET Core. Successor of Phalanger.
PowerBuilder
Can target CLI since version 11.1.
PowerShell
An object-oriented command-line shell. PowerShell can dynamically load .NET assemblies that were written in any CLI language. PowerShell uses a unique scripting syntax and uses curly-braces, similar to other C-based languages.
RemObjects Mercury
A Visual Basic (.NET)-based CLI language.
Rust
A research project for an experimental .NET back-end for Rust.
Silverfrost FTN95
An implementation of Fortran 95.
Small Basic
A BASIC-derived language created by Microsoft for teaching programming. Supported releases target .NET Framework versions 3.5 and 4.5.
Swift
via the RemObjects Silver compiler & multi-platform targeting.
Synergy DBL .NET
An object-oriented CLI compliant implementation of DBL and DIBOL produced by Synergex.
Team Developer
SQLWindows Application Language (SAL) since Team Developer 6.0.
Visual Basic (.NET)
A redesigned dialect of Visual Basic (classic). Implementations provided by .NET Framework, .NET Core, and Mono.
Visual COBOL
An enhanced version of COBOL ported to the .NET Framework and Java virtual machine (JVM), made by Micro Focus.
XSharp
X# is an open source development language for .NET, based on the xBase language. It comes in different flavors, such as Core, Visual Objects, Vulcan.NET, xBase++, Harbour, Foxpro, and more.

=== Abandoned or deprecated languages ===
A#
CLI implementation of Ada.
Axum
An actor model concurrent programming language.
Cobra
A CLI language with static and dynamic typing, design by contract and built-in unit testing.
Fantom
A language compiling to .NET (development ended) and to the JVM
GrGen.NET
A CLI language for graph rewriting
IronRuby
An open-source CLI implementation of Ruby, built on the Dynamic Language Runtime (DLR).
J#
A CLI-compliant implementation of Java. The compiler is provided by Microsoft. J# has been discontinued. The last version shipped with Visual Studio 2005, and was supported until 2015.
JScript .NET
A CLI implementation of ECMAScript version 3, compatible with JScript. Contains extensions for static typing. Deprecated in favor of Managed JScript.
Managed Extensions for C++
A version of C++ targeting the Common Language Runtime (CLR). Deprecated in favor of C++/CLI.
Managed JScript
A CLI implementation of JScript built on the Dynamic Language Runtime (DLR). Conforms to ECMAScript version 3.
Nemerle
A multi-paradigm language similar to C#, OCaml and Lisp.
Niecza
A CLI implementation of Perl 6.
Phalanger
An implementation of PHP with extensions for ASP.NET. Predecessor of PeachPie.
UnityScript
JavaScript-like language, specific to the Unity game engine. Deprecated in favor of C#.

== Related ==
IKVM
A Java virtual machine that can be used to run Java and other JVM languages (e.g., JVM like Groovy, Scala) upon CLI implementations.

== See also ==
- List of JVM languages
- List of open-source programming languages
- .NET Framework, the original, soon-to-be-deprecated implementation.
  - Common Language Infrastructure (CLI), an open specification of the run time environment (virtual machine component) of .NET framework
  - Common Intermediate Language (CIL), an intermediate language that can be executed using an implementation of CLI
  - Common Language Runtime, the virtual machine component of Microsoft's implementation of the .NET Framework.
  - .NET standard libraries
    - Base Class Library (BCL)
- Mono, an open source implementation of .NET Framework, used in many places including Unity and Xamarin.
- .NET Core, the open source cross-platform successor to .NET Framework.
