= SharpDevelop =

Integrated development environment

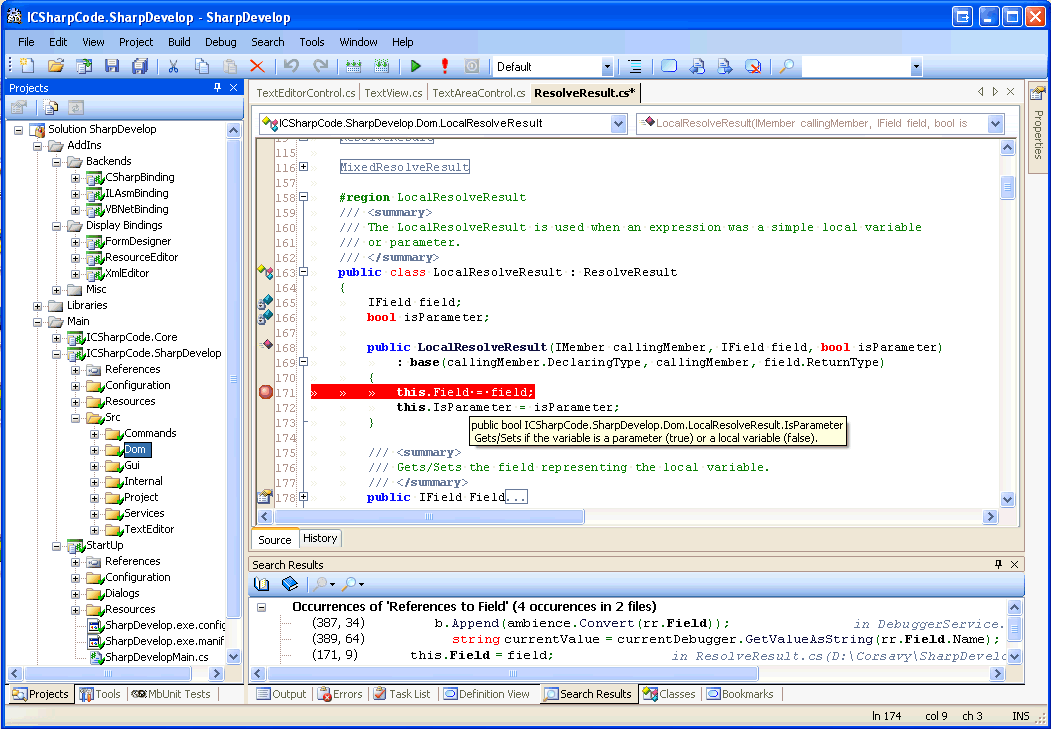
- Developer: IC#Code Team
- Final release: 5.1.0 / 14 April 2016; 9 years ago
- Written in: C#
- Operating system: Microsoft Windows
- Type: Integrated development environment
- License: MIT License
- Repository: github.com/icsharpcode/SharpDevelop

SharpDevelop (also styled as #develop) is a discontinued free and open source integrated development environment (IDE) for the .NET Framework, Mono, Gtk# and Glade# platforms. It supports development in C#, Visual Basic .NET, Boo, F#, IronPython and IronRuby programming languages.

The IDE can still be downloaded and continues to be used by developers working on C# .Net Framework projects. The last release of SharpDevelop was only aimed at C# projects. There was little significant development to the .NET Framework following this release, and this version remains a valid option for developers targeting that platform. Support for other project types is available in the 4.X series releases, but they may not be compatible with later versions of the .NET Framework.

== Features ==
SharpDevelop was designed as a free, lightweight alternative to Microsoft Visual Studio, and contains an equivalent feature for almost every essential Visual Studio Express feature and features very similar to those found in Borland Kylix and Delphi, including advanced project management, code editing, application compiling and debugging functionality. More specifically, the IDE includes a GUI designer, code/design views, syntax highlighting, auto completion menus (similar to IntelliSense) the ability to compile and debug form/console .NET Framework applications, a "New Project" wizard, toolbars, menus, panels and a docking system, and built-in code refactoring tools, and it has an integrated debugger that allows for stepping, viewing values of objects in memory, and breakpoints.

To allow for easy project migration, SharpDevelop works natively with Visual Studio project and code files. It is able to compile applications for .NET Framework version 2.0, 3.0, 3.5, 4.0, 4.5.1 and the .NET Compact Framework 2.0 and 3.5.

SharpDevelop's Graphic User Interface Designers work with the C#, VB.NET, Boo, and the IronPython and IronRuby languages, using the following GUI technologies:

- Windows Forms
- Windows Presentation Foundation (WPF)
- Entity Framework

SharpDevelop was written entirely in C# and consists of about 20 components that integrate to form the application. The source-code editor component, known as AvalonEdit, can be used by other applications.

It also includes functionality for:

- External COM and ActiveX components
- Code analysis (FxCop)
- Unit testing (NUnit)
- Code coverage (PartCover)
- Profiler
- Subversion (TortoiseSVN)
- Git
- Mercurial
- StyleCop add-in
- Documentation generation (Sandcastle, SHFB)
- Plugins

== History ==
On 11 September 2000 Mike Krueger initiated the project, while testing the first public release of .NET Framework 1.0. At that time there was no C#/.NET IDE publicly available. So he decided to write a code editor to run the compiler. Early in its development, the project was split for Mono and Gtk# development into the MonoDevelop project, which is maintained as a cross-platform IDE, and after Microsoft's acquisition of Xamarin, has become the basis of Visual Studio for Mac.

As of 2013, SharpDevelop had been downloaded at least 8 million times worldwide, The SharpDevelop codebase was documented in the book Dissecting a C# Application: Inside SharpDevelop (2003) written by the core development team and published by Wrox Press.

On 18 September 2017, Daniel Grunwald of the ICSharpCode team announced the project is "dead" for reasons related to the fast pace of changes to C# and .NET, including .NET Core, and suggested SharpDevelop users switch to either MonoDevelop or Visual Studio Code IDEs, each being recommended as a suitable open source replacement that is the target of regular updates and other maintenance.

== See also ==
- Comparison of integrated development environments
- Visual Studio
- .NET Framework § Licensing
- Software development kit
