= List of C Sharp software =

C# is a programming language. The following is a list of software programmed in it:

- Colectica — a suite of programs for use in managing official statistics and statistical surveys using open standards.
- Chocolatey — an open source package manager for Windows.
- Docky — a free and open-source application launcher for Linux.
- FlashDevelop — an integrated development environment (IDE) for development of Adobe Flash websites, web applications — desktop applications and video games.
- GameMaker Studio 2, a game engine with an editor written in C#
- HandBrake — a free and open-source transcoder for digital video files.
- KeePass — a free and open-source password manager primarily for Windows.
- Low Orbit Ion Cannon (LOIC) — an open-source network stress testing and denial-of-service attack application.
- Lphant — a peer-to-peer file sharing client.
- MonoDevelop — an open source integrated development environment.
- NMath — a numerical package for the Microsoft .NET Framework.
- Open Dental — a dental practice management software.
- OpenRA — a free remake of the classic Command & Conquer game.
- osu! — a free and open-source (before freeware) Indie rhythm game with 4 modes for Microsoft Windows — Linux and macOS.
- Paint.NET — a freeware raster graphics editor program for Microsoft Windows, developed on the .NET Framework..
- Pinta — an open-source, cross-platform bitmap image drawing and editing program.
- Windows Installer XML (WiX) — a free software toolset that builds Windows Installer packages from XML.
- WorldWide Telescope — an astronomical data visualization tool.

== Integrated Development Environments ==
- Microsoft Visual Studio
- MonoDevelop
- SharpDevelop
- SlickEdit
- Understand
- Visual Studio Code
- Xamarin Studio
- Eclipse
- Rider

== Compilers ==
- Visual C# Express
- Mono
- Portable.NET
- SharpDevelop
- Roslyn
- IL2CPU
- Bartok
- RyuJIT
- CoreRT

== Debuggers ==
- Visual Studio Debugger — the integrated debugger in Microsoft Visual Studio
- dnSpy — a .NET assembly editor and debugger
- WinDbg — powerful Windows debugger from Microsoft
- JetBrains Rider Debugger — integrated debugger in JetBrains Rider IDE
- SharpDevelop — open-source IDE with an integrated debugger for C# and other .NET languages.

== AI and machine learning ==
- TensorFlow .NET bindings — API in C# for a .NET Standard binding for TensorFlow

== See also ==
- List of programming software development tools by programming language
