= Bit-stream transmission =

In telecommunications, the term bit-stream transmission has the following meanings:

1. In bit-oriented systems, the transmission of bit strings.

2. In character-oriented systems, the transmission of bit streams that represent characters.

In bit-stream transmission, the bits usually occur at fixed time intervals, start and stop signals are not used, and the bit patterns follow each other in sequence without interruption.
