= Polymorphic association =

Polymorphic association is a term used in discussions of object–relational mapping (ORM) with respect to the problem of representing in the relational database domain, a relationship from one class to multiple classes. In statically typed languages such as C# and Java these multiple classes are subclasses of the same superclass. In languages with duck typing, such as Python, this is not necessarily the case.

== See also ==
- Polymorphism in object-oriented programming
- Hibernate (Java)
