= MonoDevelop =

Integrated development environment, discontinued for macOS

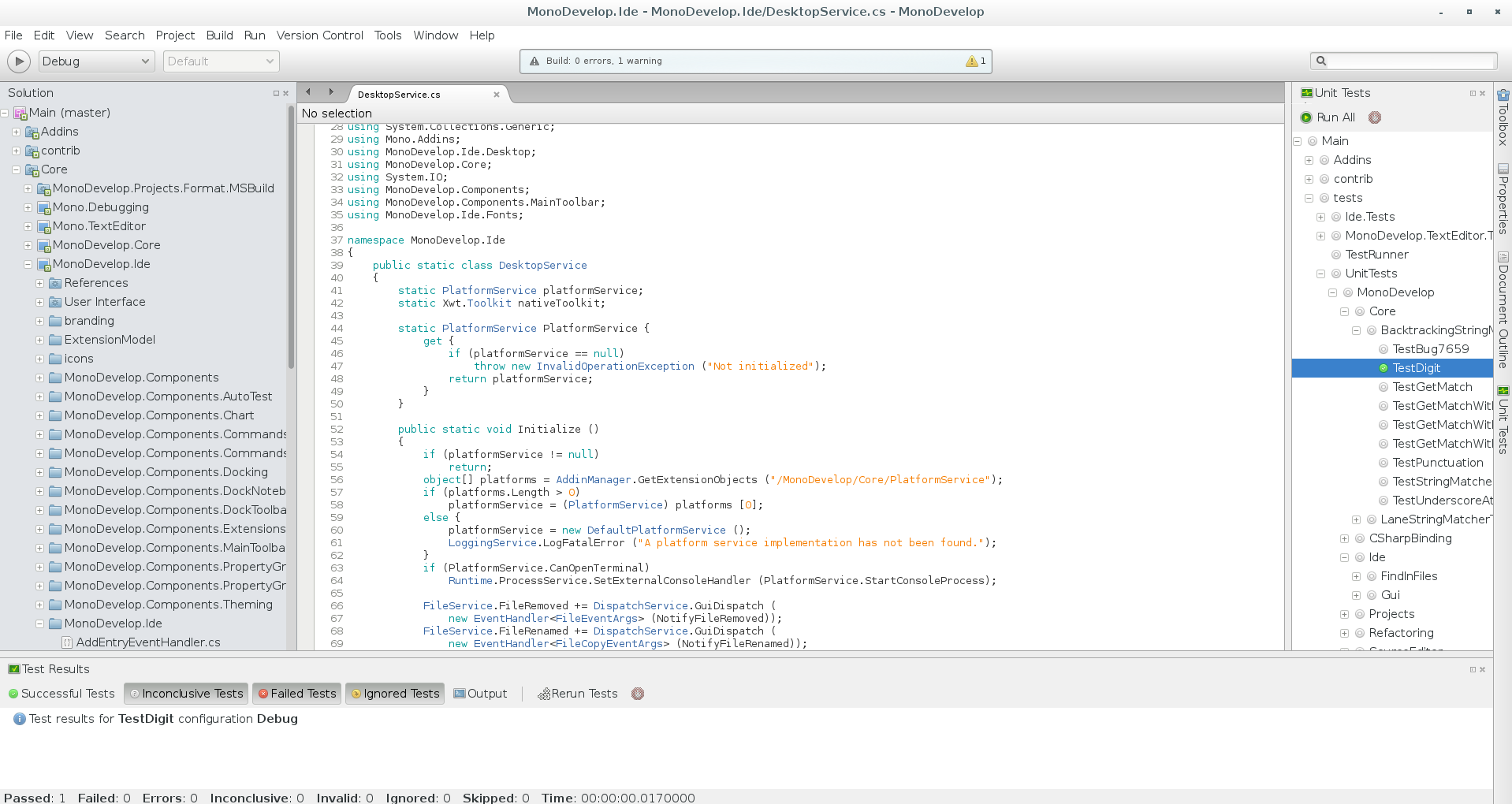
- Developers: Xamarin (a Microsoft subsidiary) and the Mono community
- Stable release: 7.6.9.22 / September 21, 2018; 8 years ago
- Written in: C#
- Operating system: Linux, macOS, Windows
- Available in: Multilingual
- Type: Integrated development environment
- License: LGPLv2 (core); MIT X11 (portions of the code and add-ins)
- Website: www.monodevelop.com
- Repository: github.com/mono/monodevelop

MonoDevelop (also known as Xamarin Studio) is a discontinued open-source integrated development environment for Linux, macOS, and Windows. Its primary focus is development of projects that use Mono and .NET Framework. MonoDevelop integrates features similar to those of NetBeans and Microsoft Visual Studio, such as automatic code completion, source control, a graphical user interface (GUI), and Web designer. MonoDevelop integrates a Gtk# GUI designer called Stetic. It supports Boo, C, C++, C#, CIL, D, F#, Java, Oxygene, Vala, JavaScript, TypeScript, and Visual Basic.NET. Although there is no word from the developers that it has been discontinued, nonetheless, it hasn't been updated in 4 years and is no longer installable on major operating systems, such as Ubuntu 22.04 and above.

MonoDevelop can be used on Linux, macOS, and Windows. Officially supported Linux distributions include CentOS, Debian, Fedora, openSUSE, SUSE Linux Enterprise, Red Hat Enterprise Linux, and Ubuntu, with many other distributions providing their own unofficial builds of MonoDevelop in their repositories. macOS and Windows have been officially supported since version 2.2.

MonoDevelop has included a C# compiler (an alternative to MSBuild and CSC) since its earliest versions. It currently includes a compiler that supports C# 1.0, C# 2.0, C# 3.0, C# 4.0, C# 5.0, and C# 6.0.

A customized version of MonoDevelop formerly shipped with Windows and Mac versions of Unity, the game engine by Unity Technologies. It enabled advanced C# scripting, which was used to compile cross-platform video games by the Unity compiler. It has since been replaced by Visual Studio Community, except on Linux versions.

== History ==
In late 2003, a group of developers from the Mono community began migrating SharpDevelop, a successful .NET open source IDE, from Windows Forms on Windows to GTK on Linux. The fork was also to target the Mono framework instead of the Microsoft .NET Framework implementation. Being an early fork of SharpDevelop, MonoDevelop architecturally differs from recent SharpDevelop releases.

Over time, the MonoDevelop project was absorbed into the rest of the Mono project and as of 2016, was actively maintained by Xamarin and the Mono community. Since Mono 1.0 Beta 2, MonoDevelop was bundled with Mono releases.

Starting with version 4.x, Xamarin rebranded MonoDevelop as Xamarin Studio, but only for the Windows version of the IDE. As of 2016, Xamarin Studio also runs on macOS.

In October 2021, it was announced in the issue tracker that the project would be archived as it is no longer maintained.

== Features ==
MonoDevelop is an IDE for the .NET platform with features comparable to Microsoft Visual Studio. Highlights include:

- Multi-platform IDE and user projects (Linux, Windows and macOS)
- Multi-language (C#, F#, Visual Basic .NET, C/C++, Vala, JavaScript, TypeScript)
- Project templates for C#, Visual Basic, Boo, Java (IKVM) and C/C++
- Code completion support for C#, code templates, code folding
- Customizable window layouts, user defined key bindings, external tools
- Integrated Debugger for debugging Mono and native applications
- Integrated Compiler (supports up to C# 6.0)
- GTK# Visual Designer to graphically build GTK# user interfaces
- ASP.NET web projects with code completion support and testing on XSP (Mono web server).
- Source control, makefile integration, unit testing, packaging and deployment, localization

=== UI Builder ===
MonoDevelop has included a GTK# GUI designer called Stetic since version 0.1. to develop GTK+ user interfaces in C#. Stetic is very similar to Glade Interface Designer but is integrated into MonoDevelop with features such as drag and drop. It has been criticized for being more difficult to work with than the likes of Qt Designer and the Microsoft Visual Studio Windows Forms Editor when the programmer does not yet have a concrete layout in mind.

=== Xamarin Studio ===
Xamarin offers a rebranded version of MonoDevelop 4.0 as Xamarin Studio which now uses platform-specific code in various places to enhance the look and feel. While Mono provides a package for Solaris 10 running on SPARC, MonoDevelop packages for OpenSolaris are only provided by groups from the OpenSolaris community. MonoDevelop on FreeBSD is likewise supported only by the FreeBSD community.

=== Visual Studio for Mac ===
Another rebranded version of MonoDevelop is Visual Studio for Mac. Visual Studio for Mac employs many of the same tools as its Windows counterpart: for example, the Roslyn .NET Compiler Platform is used for refactoring and IntelliSense. Its project system and build engine use MSBuild; and its source editor supports TextMate bundles. It uses the same debugger engines for Xamarin and .NET Core apps, and the same designers for Xamarin.iOS and Xamarin.Android.

On August 30, 2023, Microsoft announced that Visual Studio for Mac is in the process of discontinuation, with 17.6 being the last version supported until August 31, 2024.

== See also ==
- Mono (software)
- Comparison of integrated development environments
- Glade Interface Designer
- Qt Creator
- Xamarin
- SharpDevelop
- Visual Studio
- Visual Studio Code
- JetBrains Rider
