= Hugunin =

Hugunin is a surname. Notable people with the surname include:

- Daniel Hugunin Jr. (1790–1850), American politician
- Jim Hugunin, software programmer
