= Tchart (disambiguation) =

Tchart (or Teechart) is a charting library for programmers.

Tchart may also refer to:

- TAChart, a component for the Lazarus IDE that provides charting services
- T-chart, a chart of probability distributions

== See also ==
- T Chartran (1849–1907), French propaganda painter and portrait artist
