= Character literal =

Type of literal in programming

A character literal is a type of literal in programming for the representation of a single character's value within the source code of a computer program.

Languages that have a dedicated character data type generally include character literals; these include C, C++, Java, and Visual Basic. Languages without character data types (like Python or PHP) will typically use strings of length 1 to serve the same purpose a character data type would fulfil. This simplifies the implementation and basic usage of a language but also introduces new scope for programming errors.

A common convention for expressing a character literal is to use a single quote (') for character literals, as contrasted by the use of a double quote (") for string literals. For example, 'a' indicates the single character a while "a" indicates the string a of length 1.

The representation of a character within the computer memory, in storage, and in data transmission, is dependent on a particular character encoding scheme. For example, an ASCII (or extended ASCII) scheme will use a single byte of computer memory, while a UTF-8 scheme will use one or more bytes, depending on the particular character being encoded.

Alternative ways to encode character values include specifying an integer value for a code point, such as an ASCII code value or a Unicode code point. This may be done directly via converting an integer literal to a character, or via an escape sequence.

== See also ==
- String literal
- XML Literals
- C syntax § Character constants – for multicharacter literals
