= Elements (toolchain) =

RemObjects Elements is a toolchain for software development, comprising six programming languages: C#, Swift, Go, Java, Oxygene (a form of modern Object Pascal), and Visual Basic.NET. All languages interoperate, meaning a single project can use any combination of languages, and they can all be compiled to .NET, the JVM, native, or WebAssembly. Elements supports Microsoft Windows, all Apple Inc. platforms (including iOS, visionOS and watchOS), Android, and Linux.

Elements also supports language conversion, allowing source code in one language to be rewritten in another.

Elements is supported in Visual Studio, but RemObjects also makes their own IDEs, Fire (on MacOS) and Water (on Windows.)

== Background ==
RemObjects began in 2002, creating software for Delphi, but in 2005 in response to the growth of.NET and that Delphi was targeting only native Windows, they released Oxygene (known as Chrome at the time) as a new version of Object Pascal, with more modern syntax as well as being.NET-native.

Since then, five other languages have been added to the suite, as well as compiling for the web via WebAssembly and to native architectures (e.g. Intel 32/64 or ARM64). Elements is primarily intended for developers who want to pull together libraries and codebases written in multiple languages, including legacy codebases in older languages while modernizing either with newer syntax and features or by adding in the use of newer or more popular languages. Because of the Oxygene flavour of Object Pascal, supporting Delphi apps is a primary focus, including allowing Pascal to be compiled for other architectures or providing language features that match other prominent languages.

== Approach ==
New versions of the Elements come out approximately every week.

RemObjects names its programming languages after chemical elements, sometimes with poetic or musical spelling, rather than referring to them directly. They are:

- C#: Hydrogene
- Object Pascal: Oxygene
- Java: Iodine
- Visual Basic: Mercury
- Go: Gold
- Swift: Silver

== History ==
The Elements compiler was first introduced with version 1.0 in 2005 under the name "Chrome", with support for only the Oxygene language on the.NET platform, primarily as a response to the then-new and not well-received Delphi.NET compiler from Embarcadero. Chrome saw updates to version 1.5 'Floorshow' and Chrome 2.0 'Joyride' over the next few years, moving in parallel with major advancements on the.NET platform for.NET 2.0 (Generics) and.NET 3.x (LINQ), respectively.

With the release of version 3.0 (code-named Oxygène after the Jean-Michel Jarre album of the same name) Chrome was rebranded to Oxygene in 2008, and also shipped co-branded by Embarcadero as Delphi Prism (later just Prism) as part of RAD Studio, replacing Embarcadero's own and now-defunct Delphi.NET compiler.

2010 saw the release of Oxygene 4 ("Echoes"), the last version to focus on just a single language and platform. With Oxygene 5 in 2011 and Oxygene 6 in 2013, RemObjects introduced new platform support for Java/Android (code-name "Cooper") and then Cocoa, the Apple development platform (code-name "Toffee").

Elements 7.0 was released at the beginning of 2014, adding the second programming language, C# to the compiler, and delegating Oxygene from the product name to merely branding the Object Pascal-based language.

Over the subsequent years, Elements gained support for additional languages, with Apple Swift in 2015, Java in 2017, and subsequently Google's Go and Mercury, a revitalized Visual Basic.NET. Elements also gained support for its fourth target platform, "Island", for CPU-native compilation for Windows, Linux, and WebAssembly.

In addition to the chemical elements-based names for the different languages, the "Elements" concept was carried on with the introduction of dedicated development environments alchemically named Fire (for the Mac, in 2015) and Water (for Windows, in 2018).

== Fire and Water (IDEs) ==
Fire and Water are integrated development environments developed by RemObjects Software. They are designed specifically for use with the Elements Compiler.

Fire is the version developed for macOS, while Water is intended for Microsoft Windows. Both IDEs are designed to work closely with the Elements compiler and are primarily intended for developers using the RemObjects language ecosystem. They support software development across multiple platforms, including.NET, Android, iOS, macOS, Windows, Linux, and WebAssembly.

The IDEs include standard development tools such as syntax highlighting, code completion, debugging, and project navigation. Build operations are managed using a custom system known as EBuild, which is part of the broader Elements toolchain.

The IDEs are distributed as part of the RemObjects Elements package and are updated in coordination with the compiler itself.

== In media ==
Oxygene has been mentioned several times by Verity Stob in their Chronicles of Delphi series, currently living at The Register.
