= Jim Hugunin =

Software programmer

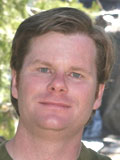
Jim Hugunin

Jim Hugunin is a software programmer who created the Python programming language extension Numeric (ancestor to NumPy), and later created Python implementations for the Java Platform (Jython) and for Microsoft .NET platform (IronPython); he has also co-designed the AspectJ extension for the Java programming language. He worked for Microsoft from 2004 to 2010, mainly on IronPython and Dynamic Language Runtime.

In October 2010, after Microsoft abandoned the IronPython project, Hugunin left Microsoft to work for Google. On his personal website, he described Microsoft's decision regarding IronPython as "a catalyst but not the cause of my leaving the company", and said that having "a healthy relationship with Open Source code and communities" at Microsoft was "possible" but "felt like trying to fit a square peg into a round hole". According to LinkedIn, Jim left Google in May 2013.

In December 2017, Jim launched a beta version of a cloth simulator called Artful Physics.
