= StaDyn =

Language for the .NET platform

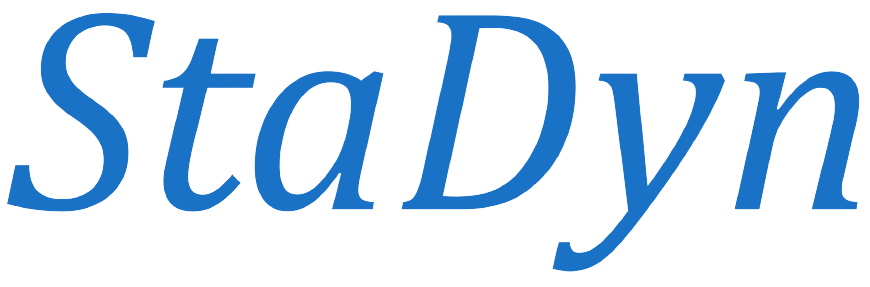
- Paradigm: Object oriented
- Designed by: Francisco Ortin
- Developer: Computational Reflection research group of the University of Oviedo
- First appeared: 2007; 19 years ago
- Stable release: 2.2.1 / 11 May 2022; 4 years ago
- Typing discipline: Hybrid static and dynamic typing, gradual typing, strong, inferred
- Implementation language: C#
- Platform: Common Language Infrastructure (.NET Framework)
- License: MIT License
- Website: reflection.uniovi.es/stadyn

Major implementations
- C#

Influenced by
- C#, OCaml, StrongTalk, Boo

StaDyn is an object-oriented general-purpose programming language for the .NET platform that supports both static and dynamic typing in the same programming language.

The StaDyn compiler gathers type information for the dynamically typed code. That type information is used to detect type errors at compilation time and to perform significant optimizations. For that purpose, it provides type reconstruction (inference), flow-sensitive types, union and intersection types, constraint-based typing, alias analysis and method specialization. Its first prototype appeared in 2007, as a modification of C# 3.0. Type inference was supported by including var as a new type, unlike C#, which only offers var to define initialized local variables. Flow-sensitive types of var references are inferred by the compiler, providing type-safe duck typing. When a more lenient approach is required by the programmer, the dynamictype could be used instead of var. Although type inference is still performed, dynamic references behave closer to those in dynamic languages.

StaDyn is designed by Francisco Ortin from the University of Oviedo. The language has been implemented by different members of the Computational Reflection research group, including Miguel Garcia, Jose Baltasar García Perez-Schofield and Jose Quiroga, besides Francisco Ortin.

The name StaDyn is a portmanteau of static and dynamic, denoting its aim to provide the benefits of both static and dynamic typing.

== Code samples ==
=== Variables with different types ===
Just like dynamic languages, variables may hold different types in the same scope:

using System;
class Program {
    public static void Main() {
        Console.Write("Number: ");
        var age = Console.In.ReadLine();
        Console.WriteLine("Digits: " + age.Length);

        age = Convert.ToInt32(age);
        age++;

        Console.WriteLine("Happy birthday, you are " + age +
                          " years old now.");
        int length = age.Length; // * Compiler error
    }
}

The age variable is first inferred as string, so it is safe to get its Length property. Then, it holds an integer, so age++ is a valid expression. The compiler detects an error in the last line, since Length is no longer provided by age.

The generated code does not use a single Object variable to represent age, but two different variables whose types are string and int. This is achieved with a modification of the algorithm to compute the SSA form. This makes the generated code to be more efficient, since runtime type conversions are not required.

=== Flow-sensitive types ===
var and dynamic variables can hold flow-sensitive types:

using System;
class Program {
    public static void Main(String[] args) {
        var exception;
        if (args.Length > 0)
            exception = new ApplicationException("An application exception.");
        else
            exception = new SystemException("A system exception.");
        Console.WriteLine(exception.Message);
    }
}

It is safe to get the Message property from exception because both ApplicationException and SystemException provide that property. Otherwise, a compiler error is shown. In this way, StaDyn provides a type-safe static duck-typing system.

In the following program:

using System;
class Program {
    public static void Main(String[] args) {
        var exception;
        switch (args.Length) {
        case 0: 
            exception = new ApplicationException("An application exception.");
            break;
        case 1:
            exception = new SystemException("A system exception.");
            break;
        default:
            exception = "This is not an exception.";
            break;
        }
        Console.WriteLine(exception.Message); // * Compiler error with var, but not with dynamic
        Console.WriteLine(exception.Unknown); // * Compiler error
    }
}

The Message property is not provided by String, so a compiler error is shown for exception.Message. However, if we declare exception as dynamic, the previous program is accepted by the compiler. dynamic is more lenient than var, following the flavor of dynamic languages. However, static type checking is still performed. This is shown in the last line of code, where the compiler shows an error for exception.Unknown even if exception is declared as dynamic. This is because neither of the three possible types (ApplicationException, SystemException and String) supports the Unknown message.

Although dynamic and var types can be used explicitly to obtain safer or more lenient type checking, the dynamism of single var references can also be modified with command-line options, XML configuration files and a plugin for Visual Studio.

=== Type inference of fields ===
var and dynamic types can be used as object fields:

class Wrapper {
    private var attribute;

    public Wrapper(var attribute) {
        this.attribute = attribute;
    }

    public var get() {
        return attribute;
    }

    public void set(var attribute) {
        this.attribute = attribute;
    }
}

class Test {
    public static void Main() {
        string aString;
        int aInt;
        Wrapper wrapper = new Wrapper("Hello");
        aString = wrapper.get();
        aInt = wrapper.get(); // * Compiler error

        wrapper.set(3);
        aString = wrapper.get(); // * Compiler error
        aInt = wrapper.get();
    }
}

The Wrapper class can wrap any type. Each time we call the set method, the type of attribute is inferred as the type of the argument. Each object has a potentially different type of attribute, so its type is stored for every single instance rather than for the whole class. In this way, the two lines indicated in the code above report compilation errors. A type-based alias analysis algorithm is implemented to support this behavior.

=== Constraint-based types ===
Let's analyze the following method:

public static var upper(var parameter) {
    return parameter.ToUpper();
}

The type of parameter and the function return value are inferred by the compiler. To that aim, a constraint is added to the type of the upper method: the argument must provide a ToUpper method with no parameters. At each invocation, the constraint will be checked. Additionally, the return type of upper will be inferred as the return type of the corresponding ToUpper method implemented by the argument.

The programmer may use either var or dynamic to declare parameter, changing the way type checking is performed upon method invocation. Let's assume that the argument passed to upper holds a flow-sensitive type (e.g., the ApplicationException, SystemException or String exception variable in the code above). With var, all the possible types of the argument must provide ToUpper; with dynamic, at least one type must provide ToUpper.

== Runtime performance ==
The type information gathered by StaDyn is used to perform significant optimizations in the generated code: the number of type inspections and type casts are reduced, reflection is avoided, frequent types are cached, and methods with constraints are specialized. The point of all the optimizations is to reduce the number of type-checking operations performed at runtime, which is the main performance penalty of most dynamic languages. Many of those type checks are undertaken earlier by the StaDyn compiler. A detailed evaluation of the runtime performance of StaDyn is detailed in.

== See also ==
- OCaml
- StrongTalk
- Boo
