= Duck typing =

Style of dynamic typing in object-oriented programming

In computer programming, duck typing is an application of the duck test—"If it walks like a duck and it quacks like a duck, then it must be a duck"—to determine whether an object can be used for a particular purpose. With nominative typing, an object is of a given type if it is declared as such (or if a type's association with the object is inferred through mechanisms such as object inheritance). With duck typing, an object is of a given type if it has all methods and properties required by that type. Duck typing may be viewed as a usage-based structural equivalence between a given object and the requirements of a type.

== In statically typed languages ==
In some statically typed languages such as Boo and D, class type checking can be specified to occur at runtime rather than at compile time.

C# can invoke dynamic typing which behaves similar to duck typing, through the keyword dynamic.

== Comparison with other type systems ==
=== Structural type systems ===
Duck typing is similar to, but distinct from, structural typing. Structural typing is a static typing system that determines type compatibility and equivalence by a type's structure, whereas duck typing is dynamic and determines type compatibility by only that part of a type's structure that is accessed during runtime.

The TypeScript, Elm and Python languages support structural typing to varying degrees.

=== Protocols and interfaces ===
Protocols and interfaces provide a way to explicitly declare that some methods, operators or behaviors must be defined. If a third-party library implements a class that cannot be modified, a client cannot use an instance of it with an interface unknown to that library even if the class satisfies the interface requirements. A common solution to this problem is the adapter pattern. In contrast, with duck typing, the object would be accepted directly without the need for an adapter.

=== Templates or generic types ===
Template (also called generic) functions or methods apply the duck test in a static typing context; this brings all of the advantages and disadvantages of static versus dynamic type checking. Duck typing can also be more flexible in that only the methods actually called at runtime must be implemented, while templates require implementations of all methods that cannot be proven unreachable at compile time.

In languages such as Java, Scala and Objective-C, reflection may be employed to inspect whether objects implement methods or add necessary methods at runtime. For example, Java's MethodHandle API can be used in this manner.

== See also ==
- Ad hoc polymorphism
- Dynamic dispatch
- Dynamic programming language
- Extension method
- Loose coupling
- Monkey patch
- Operator overloading
