= XML Literals =

In the Microsoft .NET Framework, XML Literal is a language feature that allows a computer program to include XML directly in the code without requiring string manipulation or external XML parsing. It is currently only supported in VB.NET versions 9.0 and later, introduced with Visual Studio 2008.

This feature enables developers to write markup as a native part of the programming language, improving readability and reducing errors when working with XML data. When a Visual Basic expression is embedded in an XML literal, the application creates a LINQ-to-XML object for each literal at run time, allowing for seamless integration with the LINQ framework for querying and manipulating data structures. XML Literals are particularly useful for web development scenarios involving SOAP, RSS feeds, or web services where XML processing is common.

== See also ==
- String literal
- Character literal
- ECMAScript for XML
- JSX (JavaScript)
- XHP
