= Mercury (RemObjects BASIC programming language) =

Mercury is a programming language based on VB.Net and developed by RemObjects Software.

Mercury is a commercial product and is the sixth language supported by RemObjects Elements Compiler toolchain, next to C#, Swift, Java, Go and Oxygene. It integrates with Microsoft's Visual Studio on Windows, as well as RemObjects Elements IDE called Water on Windows and Fire on macOS.
