= TAChart =

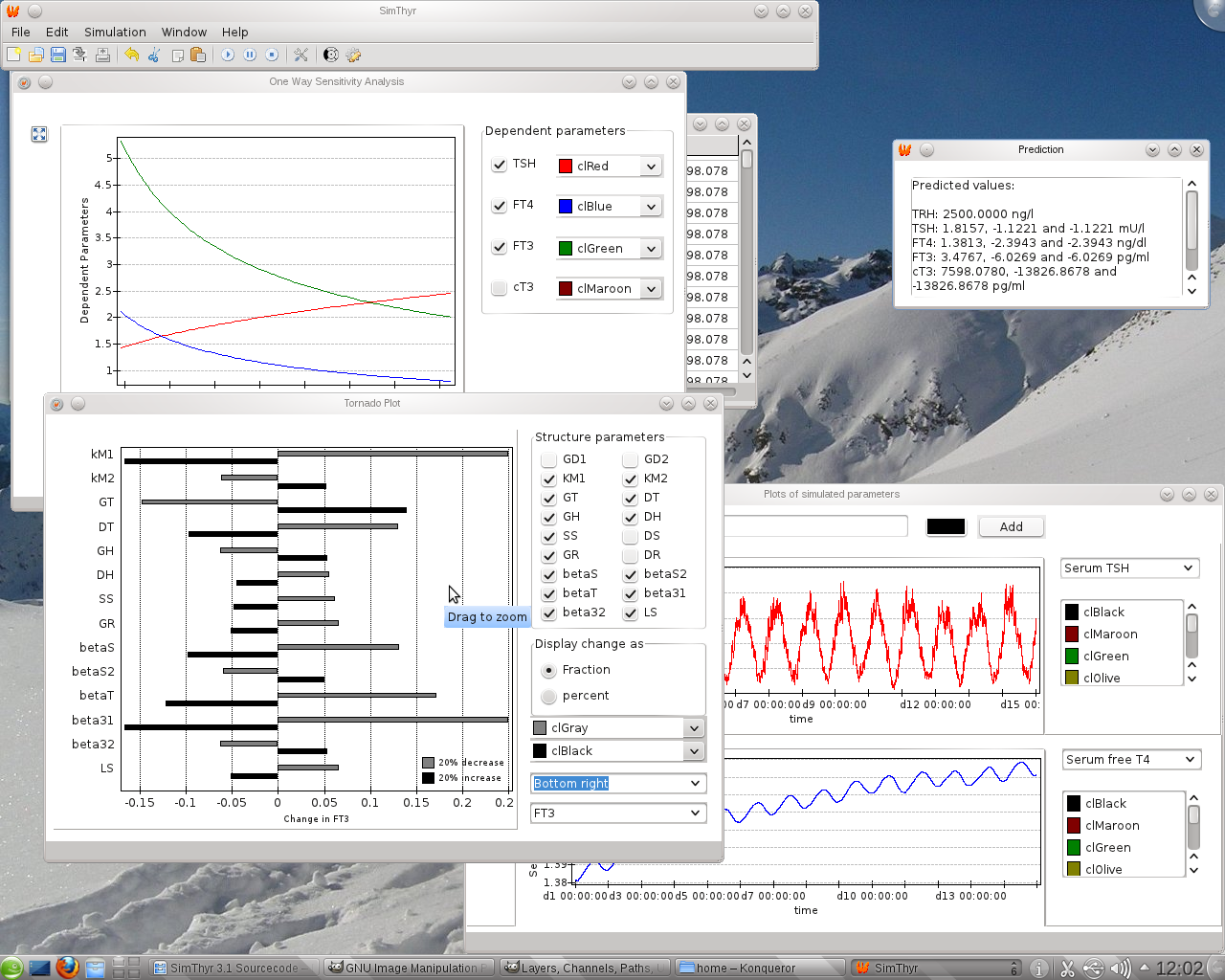
Several chart types based on TAChart in SimThyr, an application written with Lazarus

TAChart is a component for the Lazarus IDE that provides charting services. Similar to Tchart and Teechart for Delphi it supports a collection of different chart types including bar charts, pie charts, line charts and point series. Apart from a screen canvas, output is possible in form of SVG, OpenGL, printer, WMF, and other formats.

TAChart is bundled with the Lazarus Component Library. Although not intended to be a TChart clone, why its usage differs in certain points, its basic functionality is very similar and some source code written for TeeChart may be reused.

== History ==
The first version of TAChart was developed by Philippe Martinole for the TeleAuto project, a program for automation of astronomic observations. Later functionality was introduced by Luis Rodrigues while porting the Epanet application from Delphi to Lazarus. In the ensuing years the code has extensively rewritten, expanded and is now maintained by Alexander Klenin.

== Data sources ==
TAChart is able to use input from various sources. Examples include lists of real values, user defined buffers in the computer's memory, vectors of random values, fields in databases, calculated values provided by pre-defined functions and results of embedded code written in Pascal Script
