= StyleCop =

Static program analysis software

- Original author: Microsoft
- Developers: Jason Allor, Andy Reeves, Chris Dahlberg
- Stable release: 5.0.6329.1 / April 30, 2017; 8 years ago
- Repository: github.com/StyleCop/StyleCop
- Written in: C#
- Operating system: Microsoft Windows
- Platform: .NET Framework
- Type: Static code analysis tool
- License: Microsoft Public Licence
- Website: github.com/StyleCop

StyleCop is an open-source static code analysis tool from Microsoft that checks C# code for conformance to StyleCop's recommended coding styles and a subset of Microsoft's .NET Framework Design Guidelines. StyleCop analyses the source code, allowing it to enforce a different set of rules from FxCop (which, instead of source code, checks .NET managed code assemblies). The rules are classified into the following categories:

- Documentation
- Layout
- Maintainability
- Naming
- Ordering
- Readability
- Spacing

StyleCop includes both GUI and command-line versions of the tool. It is possible to add new rules to be applied.

StyleCop was originally developed by Jason Allor as a Microsoft internal tool, and was released externally as an open-source project in April 2010 on CodePlex.

StyleCop 4.7.55 (November 10, 2016) is compatible with Visual Studio 2008, 2010, 2012, 2013, and 2015. (Microsoft Visual Studio Extension)

StyleCop began a move to GitHub in December 2014, and the last change applied to the CodePlex edition was November 11, 2016.

StyleCop 5.0.6329.1 (April 30, 2017) works with Visual Studio 2012, 2013, 2015, and 2017. (Windows Installer)

Development is stopping. A named successor is StyleCopAnalyzers, for Visual Studio 2015 and later.

== See also ==
- FxCop
- List of tools for static code analysis
