= FxCop =

Static code analysis tool

- Developer(s): Microsoft
- Stable release: 10.0 / 2010; 15 years ago
- Operating system: Microsoft Windows
- Type: Static code analysis tool
- Website: msdn.microsoft.com/en-us/library/bb429476%28VS.80%29.aspx

FxCop is a free static code analysis tool from Microsoft that checks .NET managed code assemblies for conformance to Microsoft's .NET Framework Design Guidelines.

== Overview ==
Unlike StyleCop, or the Lint programming tool, for the C programming language, FxCop analyzes the compiled object code, not the original source code. It uses CIL parsing and callgraph analysis to inspect assemblies for more than 200 different possible coding standards violations in the following areas:

- COM (Interoperability) – rules that detect COM Interop issues.
- Design – rules that detect potential design flaws. These coding errors typically do not affect the execution of your code.
- Globalization – rules that detect missing or incorrect usage of information related to globalization and localization.
- Naming – rules that detect incorrect casing, cross language keyword collisions, and other issues related to the names of types, members, parameters, namespaces, and assemblies.
- Performance – rules that detect elements in your assemblies that will degrade performance.
- Security – rules that detect programming elements that leave your assemblies vulnerable to malicious users or code.
- Usage – rules that detect potential flaws in your assemblies that can affect code execution.
- Maintainability – rules that detect maintenance issues.
- Portability – rules that detect portability issues.
- Reliability – rules that detect correct memory and thread usage.

FxCop includes both GUI and command line versions of the tool. Microsoft Visual Studio 2005 and Visual Studio 2008 Team System Development Editions both include a "Code Analysis" feature based on FxCop. For Visual Studio 2010 the corresponding, and slightly enhanced, static code analysis features are included in the Premium and Ultimate editions. FxCop 10.0 is included in the Microsoft Windows SDK for Windows 7.

FxCop provides a tool to help developers to follow their company's coding standards. FxCop does code analysis to check whether the new code is compliant with the coding standards and naming conventions followed by the company. FxCop will ensure that the specified rules are used in the source code.

== See also ==
- List of tools for static code analysis
- StyleCop
