= Boo (programming language) =

- Paradigm: Object oriented
- Designed by: Rodrigo B. De Oliveira
- Developer: Mason Wheeler
- First appeared: 2003; 23 years ago
- Stable release: 0.9.7 / 25 March 2013; 13 years ago
- Typing discipline: Static, strong, inferred, duck
- Implementation language: C#
- Platform: Common Language Infrastructure (.NET Framework, Mono, .NET Core)
- License: BSD 3-Clause
- Website: github.com/boo-lang

Influenced by
- C#, Python

Influenced
- Genie, Vala

Boo is an object-oriented, statically typed, general-purpose programming language that seeks to make use of the Common Language Infrastructure's support for Unicode, internationalization, and web applications, while using a Python-inspired syntax and a special focus on language and compiler extensibility. Some features of note include type inference, generators, multimethods, optional duck typing, macros, true closures, currying, and first-class functions.

Boo was one of the three scripting languages for the Unity game engine (Unity Technologies employed De Oliveira, its designer), until official support was dropped in 2014 due to the small userbase. The Boo Compiler was removed from the engine in 2017. Boo has since been abandoned by De Oliveira, with development being taken over by Mason Wheeler.

Boo is free software released under the BSD 3-Clause license. It is compatible with the Microsoft .NET and Mono frameworks. The language was ported to .NET 10 in August 2026.

== Syntax ==
print("Hello, World!")

import System.Collections.Generic

def fib() as IEnumerable[int]:
    a, b = 0L, 1L
    # The 'L's make the numbers double word length (typically 64 bits)
    while true:
        yield b
        a, b = b, a + b

# Print the first 5 numbers in the series:
for index as int, element as int in zip(range(5) as IEnumerable[int], fib() as IEnumerable[int]):
    print("${index+1}: ${element}")

== See also ==
- Fantom
- Apache Groovy
- IronPython
- IronRuby
- Nemerle
- REBOL
- StaDyn
