= Visual Basic (.NET) =

Object-oriented computer programming language

- Paradigm: Multi-paradigm: structured, imperative, object-oriented, declarative, generic, reflective and event-driven
- Designed by: Microsoft
- Developer: Microsoft
- First appeared: 2001; 25 years ago
- Stable release: 17.13 / 11 November 2025; 12 months ago
- Typing discipline: Static, both strong and weak, both safe and unsafe, nominative
- Platform: .NET Framework, Mono, .NET
- OS: Chiefly Windows; Also on Android, BSD, iOS, Linux, macOS, Solaris, and Unix
- License: Roslyn compiler: MIT License
- Filename extensions: .vb
- Website: docs.microsoft.com/dotnet/visual-basic/

Major implementations
- .NET Framework SDK, Roslyn Compiler and Mono

Dialects
- Microsoft Visual Basic

Influenced by
- Classic Visual Basic

Influenced
- Small Basic, Mercury

Visual Basic (VB), originally called Visual Basic .NET (VB.NET), is a multi-paradigm, object-oriented programming language developed by Microsoft and implemented on .NET, Mono, and the .NET Framework. Microsoft launched VB.NET in 2002 as the successor to its original Visual Basic language, the last version of which was Visual Basic 6.0. Although the ".NET" portion of the name was dropped in 2005, this article uses "Visual Basic [.NET]" to refer to all Visual Basic languages released since 2002, in order to distinguish between them and the classic Visual Basic. Along with C# and F#, it is one of the three main languages targeting the .NET ecosystem. Microsoft updated its VB language strategy on 6 February 2023, stating that VB is a stable language now and Microsoft will keep maintaining it, but will not add support for new workloads.

Microsoft's integrated development environment (IDE) for developing in Visual Basic is Visual Studio. Most Visual Studio editions are commercial; the only exceptions are Visual Studio Express and Visual Studio Community, which are freeware. In addition, the .NET Framework SDK includes a freeware command-line compiler called vbc.exe. Mono also includes a command-line VB.NET compiler.

Visual Basic is often used in conjunction with the Windows Forms GUI library to make desktop apps for Windows. Programming for Windows Forms with Visual Basic involves dragging and dropping controls on a form using a GUI designer and writing corresponding code for each control.

== Use in making GUI programs ==
The Windows Forms library is most commonly used to create GUI interfaces in Visual Basic. All visual elements in the Windows Forms class library derive from the Control class. This provides the minimal functionality of a user interface element such as location, size, color, font, text, as well as common events like click and drag/drop. The Control class also has docking support to let a control rearrange its position under its parent.

Forms are typically designed in the Visual Studio IDE. In Visual Studio, forms are created using drag-and-drop techniques. A tool is used to place controls (e.g., text boxes, buttons, etc.) on the form (window). Controls have attributes and event handlers associated with them. Default values are provided when the control is created, but may be changed in the Visual Studio IDE GUI or in code. Many attribute values can be modified during run time by code such as based on user actions, or changes in the environment, providing a dynamic application. For example, code can be inserted into the form resize event handler to reposition a control so that it remains centered on the form, expands to fill up the form, etc. By inserting code into the event handler for a keypress in a text box, the program can automatically translate the case of the text being entered, or even prevent certain characters from being inserted.

== Syntax ==
Visual Basic uses statements to specify actions. The most common statement is an expression statement, consisting of an expression to be evaluated, on a single line. As part of that evaluation, functions or subroutines may be called and variables may be assigned new values. To modify the normal sequential execution of statements, Visual Basic provides several control-flow statements identified by reserved keywords. Structured programming is supported by several constructs including two conditional execution constructs (If ... Then ... Else ... End If and Select Case ... Case ... End Select ) and four iterative execution (loop) constructs (Do ... Loop, For ... To, For Each, and While ... End While) . The For ... To statement has separate initialisation and testing sections, both of which must be present. (See examples below.) The For Each statement steps through each value in a list.

In addition, in Visual Basic:

- There is no unified way of defining blocks of statements. Instead, certain keywords, such as "If ... Then" or "Sub" are interpreted as starters of sub-blocks of code and have matching termination keywords such as "End If" or "End Sub".
- Statements are terminated either with a colon (":") or with the end of line. Multiple-line statements in Visual Basic are enabled with " _" at the end of each such line. The need for the underscore continuation character was largely removed in version 10 and later versions.
- The equals sign ("=") is used in both assigning values to variables and in comparison.
- Round brackets (parentheses) are used with arrays, both to declare them and to get a value at a given index in one of them. Visual Basic uses round brackets to define the parameters of subroutines or functions.
- A single quotation mark (') or the keyword REM, placed at the beginning of a line or after any number of space or tab characters at the beginning of a line, or after other code on a line, indicates that the (remainder of the) line is a comment.

=== Simple example ===
The following is a very simple Visual Basic program, a version of the classic "Hello, World!" example created as a console application:

Module Module1

    Sub Main()
        ' The classic "Hello, World!" demonstration program
        Console.WriteLine("Hello, World!")
    End Sub

End Module

It prints "Hello, World!" on a command-line window. Each line serves a specific purpose, as follows:

Module Module1

This is a module definition. Modules are a division of code, which can contain any kind of object, like constants or variables, functions or methods, or classes, but can not be instantiated as objects like classes and cannot inherit from other modules. Modules serve as containers of code that can be referenced from other parts of a program.
It is common practice for a module and the code file which contains it to have the same name. However, this is not required, as a single code file may contain more than one module or class.

Sub Main()

This line defines a subroutine called "Main". "Main" is the entry point, where the program begins execution.

Console.WriteLine("Hello, world!")

This line performs the actual task of writing the output. Console is a system object, representing a command-line interface (also known as a "console") and granting programmatic access to the operating system's standard streams. The program calls the Console method WriteLine, which causes the string passed to it to be displayed on the console.

Instead of Console.WriteLine, an alternative is MsgBox, which prints the message in a dialog box instead of a command-line window.

=== Complex example ===
This piece of code outputs Floyd's Triangle to the console:

Imports System.Console

Module Program

    Sub Main()
        Dim rows As Integer

        ' Input validation.
        Do Until Integer.TryParse(ReadLine("Enter a value for how many rows to be displayed: " & vbcrlf), rows) AndAlso rows >= 1
            WriteLine("Allowed range is 1 and {0}", Integer.MaxValue)
        Loop
      
        ' Output of Floyd's Triangle
        Dim current As Integer = 1
        Dim row As Integer 
        Dim column As Integer
        For row = 1 To rows
            For column = 1 To row
                Write("{0,-2} ", current)
                current += 1
            Next

            WriteLine()
        Next
    End Sub

    ''' <summary>
    ''' Like Console.ReadLine but takes a prompt string.
    ''' </summary>
    Function ReadLine(Optional prompt As String = Nothing) As String
        If prompt IsNot Nothing Then
            Write(prompt)
        End If

        Return Console.ReadLine()
    End Function

End Module

=== Comparison with the classic Visual Basic ===
Whether Visual Basic .NET should be considered as just another version of Visual Basic or a completely different language is a topic of debate. There are new additions to support new features, such as structured exception handling and short-circuited expressions. Also, two important data-type changes occurred with the move to VB.NET: compared to Visual Basic 6, the Integer data type has been doubled in length from 16 bits to 32 bits, and the Long data type has been doubled in length from 32 bits to 64 bits. This is true for all versions of VB.NET. A 16-bit integer in all versions of VB.NET is now known as a Short. Similarly, the Windows Forms editor is very similar in style and function to the Visual Basic form editor.

The things that have changed significantly are the semantics—from those of an object-based programming language running on a deterministic, reference-counted engine based on COM to a fully object-oriented language backed by the .NET Framework, which consists of a combination of the Common Language Runtime (a virtual machine using generational garbage collection and a just-in-time compilation engine) and a far larger class library. The increased breadth of the latter was also a problem that VB developers had to deal with when coming to the language, although this was somewhat addressed by the My feature in Visual Studio 2005.

The changes altered many underlying assumptions about the "right" thing to do with respect to the performance and maintainability of applications. Some functions and libraries no longer exist; others are available, but not as efficient as the "native" .NET alternatives. Even if they compiled, most converted Visual Basic 6 applications required some level of refactoring to take full advantage of the .NET language. Microsoft provided documentation to cover changes in language syntax, debugging applications, deployment, and terminology. A popular trade book designed to ease the transition was Michael Halvorson's Microsoft Visual Basic .NET Professional Step by Step, published in 2002 by Microsoft Press.

==== Comparative examples ====
The following simple examples compare VB and VB.NET syntax. They assume that the developer has created a form, placed a button on it and has associated the subroutines demonstrated in each example with the click event handler of the mentioned button. Each example creates a "Hello, World" message box after the button on the form is clicked.

Visual Basic 6:

Private Sub Command1_Click()
    MsgBox "Hello, World"
End Sub

VB.NET (MsgBox or MessageBox class can be used):

Private Sub Button1_Click(sender As object, e As EventArgs) Handles Button1.Click
    MsgBox("Hello, World")
End Sub

- Both Visual Basic 6 and Visual Basic .NET automatically generate the Sub and End Sub statements when the corresponding button is double-clicked in design view. Visual Basic .NET will also generate the necessary Class and End Class statements. The developer need only add the statement to display the "Hello, World" message box.
- All procedure calls must be made with parentheses in VB.NET, whereas in Visual Basic 6 there were different conventions for functions (parentheses required) and subs (no parentheses allowed, unless called using the keyword Call).
- The names Command1 and Button1 are not obligatory. However, these are default names for a command button in Visual Basic 6 and VB.NET respectively.
- In VB.NET, the Handles keyword is used to make the sub Button1_Click a handler for the Click event of the object Button1. In Visual Basic 6, event handler subs must have a specific name consisting of the object's name (Command1), an underscore (_), and the event's name (Click, hence Command1_Click).
- There is a function called MessageBox.Show in the Microsoft.VisualBasic namespace which can be used (instead of MsgBox) similarly to the corresponding function in Visual Basic 6. There is a controversy about which function to use as a best practice (not only restricted to showing message boxes but also regarding other features of the Microsoft.VisualBasic namespace). Some programmers prefer to do things "the .NET way", since the Framework classes have more features and are less language-specific. Others argue that using language-specific features makes code more readable (for example, using int (C#) or Integer (VB.NET) instead of System.Int32).
- In Visual Basic 2008, the inclusion of ByVal sender as Object, ByVal e as EventArgs has become optional.

The following example demonstrates a difference between Visual Basic 6 and VB.NET. Both examples close the active window.

Visual Basic 6:

Sub cmdClose_Click()
    Unload Me
End Sub

VB.NET:

Sub btnClose_Click(sender As Object, e As EventArgs) Handles btnClose.Click
    Close()
End Sub

The 'cmd' prefix is replaced by the 'btn' prefix, conforming to the new convention previously mentioned.

Visual Basic 6 did not provide common operator shortcuts. The following are equivalent:

Visual Basic 6:

Sub Timer1_Timer()
    'Reduces Form Height by one pixel per tick
    Me.Height = Me.Height - 1
End Sub

VB.NET:

Sub Timer1_Tick(sender As Object, e As EventArgs) Handles Timer1.Tick
    Me.Height -= 1
End Sub

=== Comparison with C# ===
C# and Visual Basic are Microsoft's first languages made to program on the .NET Framework (later adding F# and more; others have also added languages). Though C# and Visual Basic are syntactically different, that is where the differences mostly end. Microsoft developed both of these languages to be part of the same .NET Framework development platform. They are both developed, managed, and supported by the same language development team at Microsoft. They compile to the same intermediate language (IL) known as CIL, which runs against the same .NET Framework runtime libraries. Although there are some differences in the programming constructs, their differences are primarily syntactic and, assuming one avoids the Visual Basic "Compatibility" libraries provided by Microsoft to aid conversion from Visual Basic 6, almost every feature in VB has an equivalent feature in C# and vice versa. Both languages reference the same Base Classes of the .NET Framework to extend their functionality, and both languages can reference compiled code written in the other language. As a result, with few exceptions, a program written in either language can be run through a simple syntax converter to translate to the other. There are many open source and commercially available products for this task.

== Examples ==
=== Hello World! ===
==== Windows Forms Application ====
Requires a button called Button1.

Public Class Form1

    Private Sub Button1_Click(sender As Object, e As EventArgs) Handles Button1.Click
        MsgBox("Hello world!", MsgBoxStyle.Information, "Hello world!") ' Show a message that says "Hello world!".
    End Sub
End Class

Hello world! window

==== Console Application ====
Module Module1

    Sub Main()
        Console.WriteLine("Hello world!") ' Write in the console "Hello world!" and start a new line.
        Console.ReadKey() ' The user must press any key before the application ends.
    End Sub
End Module

=== Speaking ===
==== Windows Forms Application ====
Requires a TextBox titled 'TextBox1' and a button called Button1.

Public Class Form1
    
    Private Sub Button1_Click(sender As Object, e As EventArgs) Handles Button1.Click
        CreateObject("Sapi.Spvoice").Speak(TextBox1.Text)
    End Sub
End Class

==== Console Application ====
Module Module1
    Private Voice = CreateObject("Sapi.Spvoice")
    Private Text As String

    Sub Main()
        Console.Write("Enter the text to speak: ") ' Say "Enter the text to speak: "
        Text = Console.ReadLine() ' The user must enter the text to speak.
        Voice.Speak(Text) ' Speak the text the user has entered.
    End Sub
End Module

== Version history ==
Succeeding the classic Visual Basic version 6.0, the first version of Visual Basic .NET debuted in 2002. As of 2020, ten versions of Visual Basic .NET are released.

=== 2002 (VB 7.0) ===
The first version, Visual Basic .NET, relies on .NET Framework 1.0. The most important feature is managed code, which contrasts with the classic Visual Basic.

=== 2003 (VB 7.1) ===
Visual Basic .NET 2003 was released with .NET Framework 1.1. New features included support for the .NET Compact Framework and a better VB upgrade wizard. Improvements were also made to the performance and reliability of .NET IDE (particularly the background compiler) and runtime. In addition, Visual Basic .NET 2003 was available in the Visual Studio.NET Academic Edition, distributed to a certain number of scholars from each country without cost.

=== 2005 (VB 8.0) ===
After Visual Basic .NET 2003, Microsoft dropped ".NET" from the name of the product, calling the next version Visual Basic 2005.

For this release, Microsoft added many features intended to reinforce Visual Basic .NET's focus as a rapid application development platform and further differentiate it from C#., including:

- Edit and Continue feature
- Design-time expression evaluation
- A pseudo-namespace called "My", which provides:
  - Easy access to certain areas of the .NET Framework that otherwise require significant code to access like using My.Form2.Text = " MainForm " rather than System.WindowsApplication1.Forms.Form2.text = " MainForm "
  - Dynamically generated classes (e.g. My.Forms)
- Improved VB-to-VB.NET converter
- A "using" keyword, simplifying the use of objects that require the Dispose pattern to free resources
- Just My Code feature, which hides (steps over) boilerplate code written by the Visual Studio .NET IDE and system library code during debugging
- Data Source binding, easing database client/server development

To bridge the gaps between itself and other .NET languages, this version added:

- Generics
- Partial classes, a method of defining some parts of a class in one file and then adding more definitions later; particularly useful for integrating user code with auto-generated code
- Operator overloading and nullable types
- Support for unsigned integer data types commonly used in other languages

Visual Basic 2005 introduced the IsNot operator that makes 'If X IsNot Y' equivalent to 'If Not X Is Y'. It gained notoriety when it was found to be the subject of a Microsoft patent application.

=== 2008 (VB 9.0) ===
Visual Basic 9.0 was released along with .NET Framework 3.5 on November 19, 2007.

For this release, Microsoft added many features, including:

- A true conditional operator, "If(condition as Boolean, truepart, falsepart)", to replace the "IIf" function.
- Anonymous types
- Support for LINQ
- Lambda expressions
- XML Literals
- Type Inference
- Extension methods

=== 2010 (VB 10.0) ===
In April 2010, Microsoft released Visual Basic 2010. Microsoft had planned to use Dynamic Language Runtime (DLR) for that release but shifted to a co-evolution strategy between Visual Basic and sister language C# to bring both languages into closer parity with one another. Visual Basic's innate ability to interact dynamically with CLR and COM objects has been enhanced to work with dynamic languages built on the DLR such as IronPython and IronRuby. The Visual Basic compiler was improved to infer line continuation in a set of common contexts, in many cases removing the need for the " _" line continuation characters. Also, existing support of inline Functions was complemented with support for inline Subs as well as multi-line versions of both Sub and Function lambdas.

=== 2012 (VB 11.0) ===
Visual Basic 2012 was released alongside .NET Framework 4.5. Major features introduced in this version include:

- Asynchronous programming with "async" and "await" statements
- Iterators
- Call hierarchy
- Caller information
- "Global" keyword in "namespace" statements

=== 2013 (VB 12.0) ===
Visual Basic 2013 was released alongside .NET Framework 4.5.1 with Visual Studio 2013. Can also build .NET Framework 4.5.2 applications by installing Developer Pack.

=== 2015 (VB 14.0) ===
Visual Basic 2015 (code named VB "14.0") was released with Visual Studio 2015. Language features include a new "?." operator to perform inline null checks, and a new string interpolation feature is included to format strings inline.

=== 2017 (VB 15.x) ===
Visual Basic 2017 (code named VB "15.0") was released with Visual Studio 2017. Extends support for new Visual Basic 15 language features with revision 2017, 15.3, 15.5, 15.8. Introduces new refactorings that allow organizing source code with one action.

=== 2019 (VB 16.x) ===
Visual Basic 2019 (code named VB "16.0") was released with Visual Studio 2019. It is the first version of Visual Basic focused on .NET Core.

A minor update was later released as Visual Basic 16.9 which only added the ability to consume init-only properties. This was done to maintain compatibility with C# 9.0 per the current development strategy of the language.

=== 2022 (VB 17.0) ===
Visual Basic 17.0 enables the System.Runtime.CompilerServices.CallerArgumentExpressionAttribute.

=== 2026 (VB 17.13) ===
Visual Basic 17.13 recognizes the unmanaged generic constraint and the System.Runtime.CompilerServices.OverloadResolutionPriorityAttribute for method resolution.

== Cross-platform and open-source development ==
The official Visual Basic compiler is written in Visual Basic and is available on GitHub as a part of the .NET Compiler Platform. The creation of open-source tools for Visual Basic development has been slow compared to C#, although the Mono development platform provides an implementation of Visual Basic-specific libraries and a Visual Basic 2005 compatible compiler written in Visual Basic, as well as standard framework libraries such as Windows Forms GUI library.

MonoDevelop was an open-source alternative IDE. The Gambas environment is also similar but distinct from Visual Basic, as is the Visual FB Editor for FreeBasic.

== See also ==
- Microsoft Visual Studio Express
- List of .NET libraries and frameworks
- Comparison of C# and Visual Basic .NET
- Visual Basic for Applications
- Microsoft Small Basic
- Comparison of programming languages
