= IronRuby =

.NET implementation of Ruby

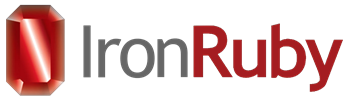
- Original author: Microsoft Dynamic Language Runtime Team
- Developer: .NET Foundation
- Initial release: August 31, 2007; 18 years ago
- Stable release: IronRuby 1.0 / April 12, 2010; 15 years ago
- Preview release: IronRuby 1.1.3 / March 13, 2011; 14 years ago
- Repository: github.com/IronLanguages/ironruby
- Written in: C#
- Operating system: Windows, Linux, macOS
- Platform: .NET Framework, Mono
- Type: Ruby programming language compiler
- License: Apache License 2.0
- Website: www.ironruby.net

IronRuby is an implementation of the Ruby programming language targeting Microsoft .NET Framework. It is implemented on top of the Dynamic Language Runtime (DLR), a library running on top of the Common Language Infrastructure that provides dynamic typing and dynamic method dispatch, among other things, for dynamic languages.

The project is currently inactive, with the last release of IronRuby (version 1.1.3) being in March 2011.

== History ==
On April 30, 2007, at MIX 2007, Microsoft announced IronRuby, which uses the same name as Wilco Bauwer's IronRuby project with permission. It was planned to be released to the public at OSCON 2007.

On July 23, 2007, as promised, John Lam and the DLR Design Team presented the pre-Alpha version of the IronRuby compiler at OSCON. He also announced a quick timeline for further integration of IronRuby into the open source community.

On August 31, 2007, John Lam and the DLR Design Team released the code in its pre-alpha stage on RubyForge. The source code has continued to be updated regularly by the core Microsoft team (but not for every check-in). The team also does not accept community contributions for the core Dynamic Language Runtime library, at least for now.

On July 24, 2008, the IronRuby team released the first binary alpha version, in line with OSCON 2008. On November 19, 2008, they released a second Alpha version.

The team actively worked to support Rails on IronRuby. Some Rails functional tests started to run, but a lot of work still needed to be done to be able to run Rails in a production environment.

On May 21, 2009, they released 0.5 version in conjunction with RailsConf 2009. With this version, IronRuby could run some Rails applications, but still not on a production environment.

Version 0.9 was announced as OSCON 2009. This version improved performance. Version 1.0 RC1 became available on November 20, 2009.

Version 1.0 became available on April 12, 2010, in two different versions:

- The preferred one, which runs on top of .NET 4.0.
- A version with more limited features, which ran on top of .NET 2.0. This version was the only one compatible with Mono.

The IronRuby team planned to support Ruby 1.8.6 only for 1.0 point releases, and 1.9 version only for upcoming 1.x releases, skipping support for Ruby 1.8.7.

In July 2010, Microsoft let go Jimmy Schementi, one of two remaining members of the IronRuby core team, and stopped funding the project. In October 2010 Microsoft announced the Iron projects (IronRuby and IronPython) were being changed to "external" projects and enabling "community members to make contributions without Microsoft's involvement or sponsorship by a Microsoft employee".

The last published release of IronRuby was on March 13, 2011 as version 1.1.3.

== Architecture ==
=== Mono support ===
IronRuby may run as well on Mono as it does on Microsoft Common Language Runtime (CLR), but as the IronRuby team only tests it with the CLR on Windows., it may not build on Mono depending on the build.

=== .NET interoperability ===
The interoperability between IronRuby classes and regular .NET Framework classes is very limited because many Ruby classes are not .NET classes. However, better support for dynamic languages in .NET 4.0 may increase interoperability in the future.

=== Silverlight support ===
IronRuby was supported on Silverlight. It could be used as a scripting engine in the browser just like the JavaScript engine. IronRuby scripts were passed like simple client-side JavaScript-scripts in <script>-tags. It is then also possible to modify embedded XAML markup.

The technology behind this was called Gestalt.

//DLR initiation script.
<script src="http://gestalt.ironruby.net/dlr-latest.js" type="text/javascript">

//Client-side script passed to IronRuby and Silverlight.
<script type="text/ruby">
    window.Alert("Hello from Ruby")
</script>

The same worked for IronPython.

=== Testing infrastructure ===
IronRuby integrated RubySpec, which is a project to write a complete, executable specification for the Ruby programming language. The IronRuby Git repo includes a copy of the RubySpec tests, including the MSpec test framework.

== License ==
IronRuby was previously released under the Microsoft Public License, which is OSI-certified BSD-style license.

On July 16, 2010, Microsoft re-licensed IronRuby along with the DLR under the Apache License 2.0.

== See also ==
- IronPython
- IronScheme
- JRuby
- Ruby on Rails, an open source web application framework for Ruby
