= Glauber =

Glauber or Gláuber may refer to:

== People ==
- Gláuber (footballer, born 1981) (Gláuber Vian Corrêa), Brazilian football defender
- Gláuber (footballer, born 1983) (Gláuber Leandro Honorato Berti), Brazilian football centre back
- Glauber (footballer, born 1983) (Glauber Rodrigues da Silva), Brazilian football midfielder
- Glauber (footballer, born 1996) (Glauber Gomes dos Santos), Brazilian footballer
- Gláuber (footballer, born 2000) (Gláuber Siqueira dos Santos Lima), Brazilian football defender
- Glauber Braga (born 1982), Brazilian politician
- Glauber Rocha (1939–1981), Brazilian filmmaker
- Caden Glauber (born 2008), American baseball player
- Johann Rudolf Glauber (1604–1670), Dutch-German alchemist and chemist
- Roy J. Glauber (1925–2018), American physicist
- Thorsten Glauber (born 1970), German politician

=== Fictional characters ===
- Lucky Glauber, fictional video game character

== Places ==
- Glauber (crater)

== Other uses ==
- Glauber discovery system, a computer software system
- Glauber coherent states, specific quantum states
