= Mako (template engine) =

Python template library

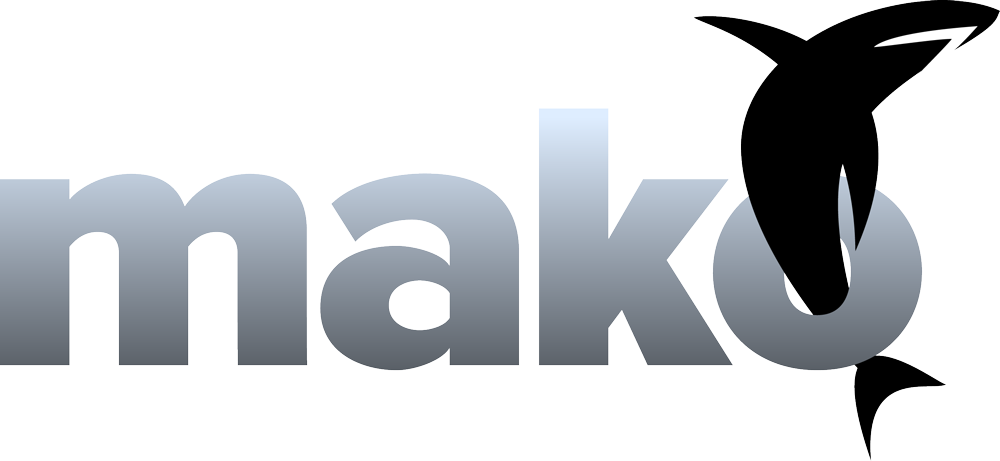
- Original author(s): Mike Bayer
- Initial release: December 31, 2006; 18 years ago
- Stable release: 1.3.9
- Repository: github.com/sqlalchemy/mako
- Written in: Python
- Type: Template engine
- License: MIT License
- Website: bitbucket.org/zzzeek/mako

Mako is a template library written in Python. Mako is an embedded Python (i.e. Python Server Page) language, which refines the familiar ideas of componentized layout and inheritance. The Mako template is used by Reddit. It is the default template language included with the Pylons and Pyramid web frameworks.

== See also ==
- CheetahTemplate
- Genshi
- Jinja
