= Spyce =

Spyce may refer to:

- Release the Spyce anime
- Spyce (software), similar to PHP for Python
- Spyce Kitchen, an innovative restaurant
