= Discovery system =

Discovery system can mean:

- Discovery system (bibliographic search), a type of bibliographical search system
- Discovery system (AI research), an artificial intelligence system that attempts to discover new scientific concepts or laws
