= Rutherford (lunar crater) =

Crater on the Moon

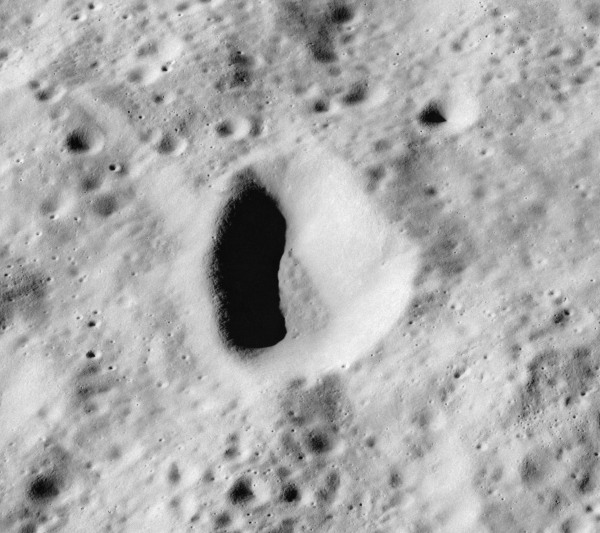
- Oblique Apollo 16 image
- Coordinates: 10.7°N 137.0°E
- Diameter: 13 km
- Colongitude: 223° at sunrise
- Formation: Copernican
- Eponym: Ernest Rutherford

Rutherford is a small lunar impact crater that lies on the Moon's far side. It was named after New Zealand-British physicist and Nobel laureate Ernest Rutherford. It is located just to the north-northwest of Mendeleev, a huge walled plain. To the east of Rutherford is the equally diminutive crater Glauber, and to the west-northwest lies Hoffmeister.

On the lunar geologic time scale, this formation dates to the Copernican period. The crater has a roughly pear-shaped outline, with an elongated section at the north-northwestern end. The rim edge is well-defined and the inner walls are simple slopes that run down to the small interior floor.
