= Cherry pie (disambiguation) =

A cherry pie is a pie made with cherry filling.

Cherry Pie may also refer to:

- Cherry Pie (album), 1990, by glam metal band Warrant
  - "Cherry Pie" (Warrant song), from the album of the same name
- "Cherry Pie" (Joe Josea song), also released by Marvin & Johnny and Skip & Flip
- "Cherry Pie (I Need a Freak)", an Insane Clown Posse song from the 2000 album Bizzar
- "Cherry Pie", a song by Sade from the 1984 album Diamond Life
- "Cherry Pie", a song by Jennifer Lopez from the 2005 album Rebirth
- "Cherry Pie", a song by Underworld from the 1996 album Pearl's Girl
- Cherry Pie Picache (born 1970), Filipina actress
- The Garden Heliotrope (Heliotropium arborescens), a common ornamental plant
- The Great Willowherb (Epilobium hirsutum), a common wild plant

== See also ==
- CherryPy, a lightweight web development framework for Python
- Sherry Pie, American drag queen
