= Genshi =

Genshi may refer to:

- Fujiwara no Genshi (1016–1039), Empress consort (chūgū) of Emperor Go-Suzaku of Japan
- Genshi (templating language), an XML templating language for Python
- jido-genshi, an experimental electronic music project
