= Eurisko =

Lisp based discovery system by Douglas Lenat

- Original author: Douglas Lenat
- Written in: RLL-1
- Type: Discovery system

Eurisko (Gr., I discover) is a discovery system written by Douglas Lenat in RLL-1, a representation language itself written in the Lisp programming language. A sequel to Automated Mathematician, it consists of heuristics, i.e. rules of thumb, including heuristics describing how to use and change its own heuristics. Lenat was frustrated by Automated Mathematician's constraint to a single domain and so developed Eurisko; his frustration with the effort of encoding domain knowledge for Eurisko led to Lenat's subsequent development of Cyc. Lenat envisioned ultimately coupling the Cyc knowledge base with the Eurisko discovery engine.

== History ==
Development commenced at Carnegie Mellon in 1976 and continued at Stanford University in 1978 when Lenat returned to teach. "For the first five years, nothing good came out of it", Lenat said. But when the implementation was changed to a frame language based representation he called RLL (Representation Language Language), heuristic creation and modification became much simpler. Eurisko was then applied to a number of domains with surprising success, including VLSI chip design.

Previously, Lenat had worked at the automatic-programming research group at the Stanford Artificial Intelligence Laboratory, and was coauthor of a report in 1974 on "Program-Understanding Systems". Inspired by work on Eurisko, Lenat proposed that mutations may be highly non-random, since the DNA can code for (meta-)heuristic rules by which likely useful mutations can be made, allowing increasingly rapid evolution over time.

Lenat and Eurisko gained notoriety by submitting the winning fleet (a large number of stationary, lightly armored ships with many small weapons) to the United States Traveller TCS national championship in 1981, forcing extensive changes to the game's rules. The fleet had 96 ships, 75 of which were of the "Eurisko class". The detailed composition was published.

However, Eurisko won again in 1982 when the program discovered that the rules permitted the program to destroy its own ships, permitting it to continue to use much the same strategy. Tournament officials announced that if Eurisko won another championship the competition would be abolished; Lenat retired Eurisko from the game. The Traveller TCS wins brought Lenat to the attention of DARPA, who funded much of his subsequent work.

A screenshot of Eurisko in action is printed in a 1984 Scientific American article.

Lenat was known for keeping his source code confidential during his lifetime. In 2023, it was reported that source code for both Eurisko and the previous Automated Mathematician system had been found in public code archives. The following year, Eurisko code was shown running under Medley Interlisp.

== In popular culture ==
In the first-season The X-Files episode "Ghost in the Machine", Eurisko is the name of a fictional software company responsible for the episode's "monster of the week", facilities management software known as "Central Operating System", or "COS". COS (described in the episode as an "adaptive network") is shown to be capable of learning when its designer arrives at Eurisko headquarters and is surprised to find that COS has given itself the ability to speak. The designer is forced to create a virus to destroy COS after COS commits a series of murders in an apparent effort to prevent its own destruction.

Lenat is mentioned and Eurisko is discussed at the end of Richard Feynman's Computer Heuristics Lecture as part of the Idiosyncratic Thinking Workshop Series.

Lenat and Eurisko are mentioned in the 2019 James Rollins novel Crucible that deals with artificial intelligence and artificial general intelligence.
