= MochiKit =

Lightweight JavaScript library

- Developer(s): Bob Ippolito
- Initial release: July 27, 2005; 19 years ago
- Stable release: 1.5 / (January 5, 2013; 12 years ago)
- Repository: github.com/mochi/mochikit
- Written in: JavaScript
- Operating system: Cross-platform (JavaScript)
- Type: JavaScript library
- License: MIT License / Academic Free License
- Website: https://mochi.github.io/mochikit/

MochiKit is a light-weight JavaScript library written and maintained by Bob Ippolito.

Inspired by the Python networking framework, Twisted, it uses the concept of deferred execution to allow asynchronous behaviour. This has made it useful in the development of interactive web pages which maintain a dialog with the web server, sometimes called Ajax applications.

Of particular note is its ability to load and manipulate JSON-encoded data sets, and MochiKit.DOM, a set of functions to easily create dynamic page components.

MochiKit forms the foundation of the client-side functionality of the TurboGears Python web-application stack. Perhaps as a result of the author's involvement in the Python community, MochiKit exhibits many idioms familiar to Python programmers, and is commonly used in Python-based web applications.

== See also ==
- Comparison of JavaScript frameworks
- TurboGears
