= Douglas Lenat =

Computer scientist and AI pioneer

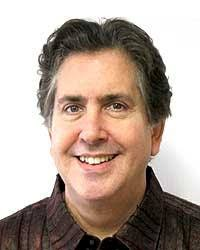
- Born: September 13, 1950; Philadelphia, Pennsylvania, U.S.
- Died: August 31, 2023 (aged 72); Austin, Texas, U.S.
- Education: University of Pennsylvania, Stanford University (Ph.D.)
- Occupation: Computer scientist
- Employer: Cycorp, Inc.
- Known for: Lisp programming language, CEO of Cycorp, Inc., AM, Eurisko, Cyc
- Awards: 1977 IJCAI Computers and Thought Award

Douglas Bruce Lenat (September 13, 1950 – August 31, 2023) was an American computer scientist and researcher in artificial intelligence who was the founder and CEO of Cycorp, Inc. in Austin, Texas.

Lenat was awarded the biannual IJCAI Computers and Thought Award in 1976 for creating the machine-learning program AM. He has worked on (symbolic, not statistical) machine learning (with his AM and Eurisko programs), knowledge representation, "cognitive economy", blackboard systems, and what he dubbed in 1984 "ontological engineering" (with his Cyc program at MCC and, since 1994, at Cycorp). He has also worked in military simulations, and numerous projects for the US government, military, intelligence, and scientific organizations. In 1980, he published a critique of conventional random-mutation Darwinism. He authored a series of articles in the Journal of Artificial Intelligence exploring the nature of heuristic rules.

Lenat was one of the original Fellows of the AAAI, and is the only individual to have served on the Scientific Advisory Boards of both Microsoft and Apple. He was a Fellow of the AAAS, AAAI, and Cognitive Science Society, and an editor of the J. Automated Reasoning, J. Learning Sciences, and J. Applied Ontology. He was one of the founders of TTI/Vanguard in 1991 and member of its advisory board. He was named one of the Wired 25.

== Background and education ==
Lenat was born in Philadelphia, United States, on September 13, 1950. When he was 5, the family moved to Wilmington, Delaware, where his father, Nathan Lenat, owned a bottling plant. His father died when he was 13 and the family then returned to Pennsylvania, where he attended Cheltenham High School. His after-school job was cleaning rat cages and goose pens at Beaver College which motivated him to learn programming as a better occupation.

He attended the University of Pennsylvania, supporting himself by programming, including the design and development of a natural language interface for a United States Navy online operations manual. He graduated with bachelor's degrees in Mathematics and Physics, and a master's degree in Applied Mathematics, all in 1972.

Lenat was a Ph.D. student in Computer Science at Stanford University, where his published research included automatic program synthesis from input/output pairs and from natural language clarification dialogues.

== Research ==
In 1976, Lenat received his Ph.D. in Computer Science from Stanford University, "AM: Discovery in mathematics as heuristic search" sponsored by ARPA. It was republished as Knowledge-based systems in artificial intelligence, along with the Ph.D. thesis of Randall Davis, McGraw-Hill, 1982. His thesis advisor was Professor Cordell Green.

His thesis, AM (Automated Mathematician) was one of the first computer programs that attempted to make discoveries, i.e., to be a theorem proposer rather than a theorem prover. Experimenting with the program fueled a cycle of criticism and improvement. Many issues had to be dealt with in constructing such a program: how to represent knowledge formally, expressively, and concretely, how to program hundreds of heuristic "interestingness" rules to judge the worth of new discoveries, heuristics for when to reason symbolically and inductively versus when to reason statistically from frequency data, what the architecture—the design constraints—of such reasoning programs might be, why heuristics work, and what their "inner structure" might be. AM was one of the first steps toward demonstrating that computer programs can make novel and creative discoveries.

In 1976, Lenat started teaching as an assistant professor of computer science at Carnegie Mellon and commenced his work on the AI program Eurisko. The limitation with AM was that it was locked into following a fixed set of interestingness heuristics; Eurisko, by contrast, represented its heuristic rules as first class objects and hence it could explore, manipulate, and discover new heuristics just as AM explored, manipulated, and discovered new domain concepts.

Lenat returned to Stanford as an assistant professor of computer science in 1978 and continued his research building the Eurisko automated discovery and heuristic-discovery program. Eurisko made many interesting discoveries and enjoyed significant acclaim, with Lenat's paper "Heuretics: Theoretical and Experimental Study of Heuristic Rules" winning the Best Paper award at the 1982 AAAI conference.

== A call for "common sense" ==
Lenat (working with John Seely Brown at Xerox PARC) published in 1984 an analysis of what were the limitations of his AM and Eurisko lines of research. It concluded that progress toward real, general, symbolic AI would require a vast knowledge base of "common sense", suitably formalized and represented, and an inference engine capable of finding tens- or hundreds-deep conclusions and arguments that followed from the application of that knowledge base to specific questions and applications.

The successes, and analysis of the limitations, of this AM and Eurisko approach to AI, and the concluding plea for the massive (multi-thousand-person-year, decades-long) R&D effort would be required to break that bottleneck to AI, led to attention in 1982 from Admiral Bob Inman and the then-forming MCC research consortium in Austin, Texas, culminating in Lenat's becoming principal scientist of MCC from 1984–1994, though he continued even after this period to return to Stanford to teach approximately one course per year. At the 400-person MCC, Lenat was able to have several dozen researchers work on that common sense knowledge base, rather than just a few graduate students.

== Cycorp ==
The fruits of the first decade of R&D on Cyc were spun out of MCC into a company, Cycorp, at the end of 1994. In 1986, he estimated the effort to complete Cyc would be at least 250,000 rules and 1,000 person-years of effort, probably twice that, and by 2017, he and his team had spent about 2,000 person-years of effort building Cyc, creating approximately 24 million rules and assertions (not counting "facts").

Lenat continued to work on Cyc as CEO of Cycorp until his death. While the first decade of work on Cyc (1984–1994) was funded by large American companies pooling long-term research funds to compete with the Japanese Fifth Generation Computer Project, and the second decade (1995–2006) of work on Cyc was funded by US government agencies' research contracts, the third decade up through the present (2007–2023) has been largely supported through commercial applications of Cyc, including in the financial services, energy, and healthcare areas. One of these later projects was a learning by teaching application called Mathcraft.

== Personal life and death ==
Lenat was married to Merle Baruch, with whom he had a daughter; they divorced and he later married Cycorp business manager Mary Shepherd. He died of bile duct cancer on August 31, 2023, at the age of 72.

== Quotes ==
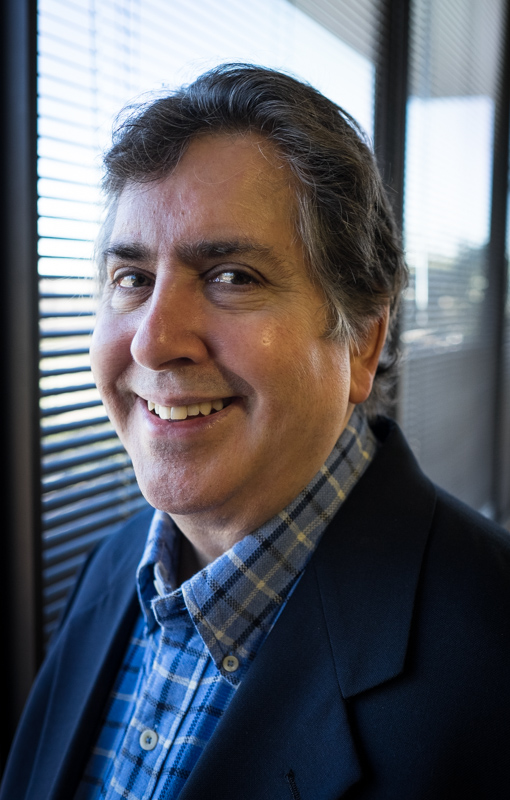
Doug Lenat in his office at Cycorp

- "Intelligence is ten million rules." This refers to the prior and tacit knowledge that authors presume their readers all possess (such as "if person x knows person y, then x's date of death can't be earlier than y's date of birth") not counting the vastly larger number of "facts" such as one might find in Wikipedia or by Googling.
- "The time may come when a greatly expanded Cyc will underlie countless software applications. But reaching that goal could easily take another two decades."
- "Once you have a truly massive amount of information integrated as knowledge, then the human-software system will be superhuman, in the same sense that mankind with writing is superhuman compared to mankind before writing."
- "Sometimes the veneer of intelligence is not enough."
- “If computers were human, they’d present themselves as autistic, schizophrenic, or otherwise brittle. It would be unwise or dangerous for that person to take care of children and cook meals, but it’s on the horizon for home robots. That’s like saying, ‘We have an important job to do, but we’re going to hire dogs and cats to do it.'”
- "What we needed, he says, is nothing less than an “AI Manhattan Project”, a full frontal assault on common sense: the challenge is to create an Encyclopédia of Common sense", Michio Kaku citing Lenat.

== Writings ==
- Brown, John Seely; Lenat, Douglas (August 1983). "Why AM and Eurisko Appear to Work". Proceedings of National Conference on AI (AAAI–83). Book One (Proceedings of the AAAI Conference on Artificial Intelligence, 3): 236–240.
- Davis, Randall; Lenat, Douglas B. (1982). Knowledge-Based Systems in Artificial Intelligence. New York: McGraw-Hill International Book Co. ISBN 978-0-07-015557-2.
- Hayes-Roth, Frederick; Waterman, Donald Arthur; Lenat, Douglas B., eds. (1983). Building Expert Systems. Reading, Mass: Addison-Wesley Pub. Co. ISBN 978-0-201-10686-2.
- Lenat, Douglas B. "Computer Software for Intelligent Systems: An Underview of AI," in Scientific American, September 1984.
- Lenat, Douglas B.; Clarkson, Albert; Kircmidjian, Garo (1983). "An Expert System for Indications & Warning Analysis". Proceedings of the Eighth International Joint Conference on Artificial Intelligence - Volume 1. IJCAI'83. San Francisco, CA, USA: Morgan Kaufmann Publishers Inc.: 259–262.
- Lenat, Douglas B.; Feigenbaum, Edward A. (February 1991). "On the Thresholds of Knowledge". Artif. Intell. 47 (1-3): 185–250. doi:10.1016/0004-3702(91)90055-O. ISSN 0004-3702.
- Lenat, Douglas B.; Guha, R. V. (1990-01-01). Building Large Knowledge-Based Systems: Representation and Inference in the Cyc Project. Reading, Mass.: Addison-Wesley. ISBN 9780201517521.
- Lenat, Douglas B. From 2001 to 2001: Common Sense and the Mind of HAL
- Lenat, Douglas B. (2008-07-10). "The Voice of the Turtle: Whatever Happened to AI?". AI Magazine. 29(2). doi:10.1609/aimag.v29i2.2106. ISSN 0738-4602
- Blackstone E.H., Lenat, D.B. and Ishwaran H. Infrastructure required to learn which care is best: methods that need to be developed, in (Olsen L., Grossman, C., and McGinnis, M., eds.) Learning What Works: Infrastructure Required for Comparative Effectiveness Research. Institute of Medicine Learning Health System Series, The National Academies Press, pp. 123–144, 2011.
- Lenat DB, Durlach P. “Reinforcing Math Knowledge by Immersing Students in a Simulated Learning-By-Teaching Experience.” J. International Journal of Artificial Intelligence in Education., 2014
- Lenat, Douglas B. (2016-04-13). "WWTS (What Would Turing Say?)". AI Magazine. 37 (1): 97–101. doi:10.1609/aimag.v37i1.2644. ISSN 0738-4602
- See also many of the References, below.
