= François Chollet =

French software engineer, artificial intelligence (born 1989)

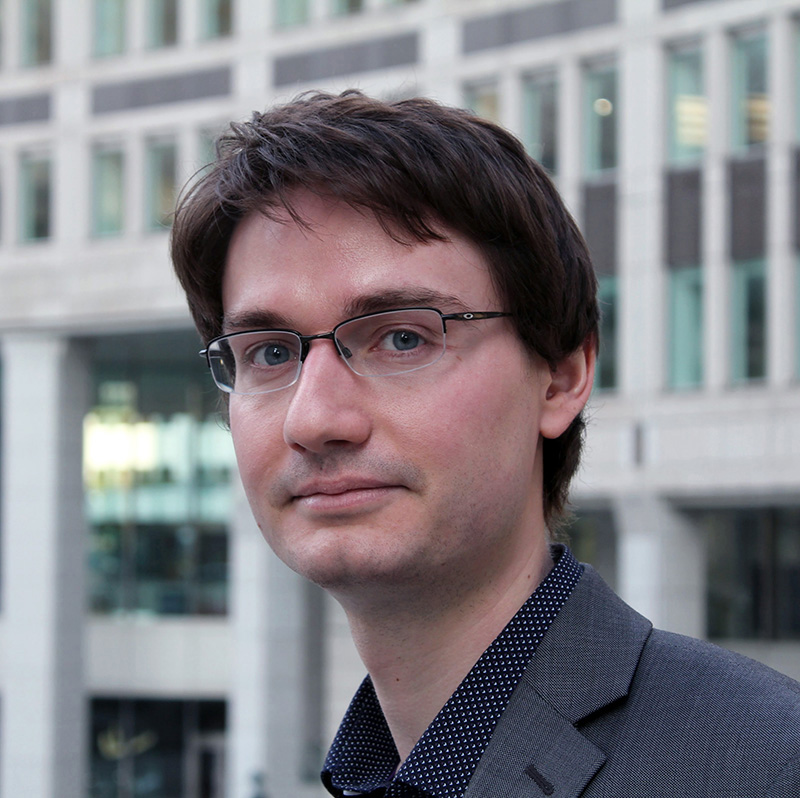
- Chollet in 2020, aged 30
- Born: October 20, 1989 (age 36)
- Education: ENSTA Paris (MEng)
- Engineering career
- Discipline: Artificial Intelligence
- Employer: Google (2015-2024)
- Projects: Keras, TensorFlow, ARC Prize
- Awards: TIME100 AI, Global Swiss AI Award
- Website: fchollet.com

François Chollet (French: [fʁɑ̃swa ʃoˈlɛ]; born 20 October 1989) is a French software engineer, artificial intelligence (AI) researcher, and former Senior Staff Engineer at Google. Chollet is the creator of the Keras deep-learning library released in 2015. His research focuses on computer vision, the application of machine learning to formal reasoning, abstraction, and how to achieve greater generality in artificial intelligence (AGI).

== Education and career ==
In 2012, Chollet graduated with a Diplôme d'Ingénieur (Master of Engineering) from ENSTA Paris, a school of the Polytechnic Institute of Paris.

In 2015, Chollet started working at Google shortly after releasing Keras.

In 2019, he published the Abstraction and Reasoning Corpus for Artificial General Intelligence (ARC-AGI) benchmark, which measures the ability of AI systems to solve novel reasoning problems.

In 2024, Chollet launched ARC Prize, a US$1 million competition to solve the ARC-AGI benchmark. He left Google in November 2024 after more than 9 years with the company to found with Zapier co-founder Mike Knoop a new startup focused on developing AGI with program synthesis.

In early 2025, Chollet announced the expansion of ARC Prize into a full-fledged non-profit foundation, to further the mission of guiding and accelerating research progress towards artificial general intelligence.

== Books and publications ==
Chollet's research papers in artificial intelligence have been published at major conferences in the field, including the Conference on Computer Vision and Pattern Recognition (CVPR), the Conference on Neural Information Processing Systems (NeurIPS), and the International Conference on Learning Representations (ICLR).

Chollet is the author of Xception: Deep Learning with Depthwise Separable Convolutions, which is among the top ten most cited papers in CVPR proceedings at more than 18,000 citations.

Chollet is the author of the book Deep Learning with Python, which sold over 100,000 copies, and the co-author with Tomasz Kalinowski of Deep Learning With R.

== Awards ==
On December 1, 2021, Chollet won the Global Swiss AI Award for breakthroughs in AI.

In September 2024, Chollet was named by TIME as one of the 100 most influential people in AI.

== Bibliography ==
- Chollet, François (2017). Deep Learning with Python. Manning Publications. ISBN 9781617294433.
- Chollet, François; Allaire, J. J. (2018). Deep Learning With R. Manning Publications. ISBN 9781617295546.
- Chollet, François (2019). On the Measure of Intelligence. arXiv:1911.01547.
- Chollet, François (2021). Deep Learning with Python Second Edition. Manning Publications. ISBN 9781617296864.
