= Keras =

Neural network library

- Original author: François Chollet
- Developer: ONEIROS
- Release: 27 March 2015; 11 years ago
- Stable release: 3.15.1 / 29 July 2026; 2 months ago
- Written in: Python
- Platform: Cross-platform
- Type: Frontend for TensorFlow, JAX or PyTorch (and more)
- License: Apache 2.0
- Website: keras.io
- Repository: github.com/keras-team/keras

Keras is an open-source library that provides a Python interface for artificial neural networks. Keras was first independent software, then integrated into the TensorFlow library, and later added support for more. "Keras 3 is a full rewrite of Keras [and can be used] as a low-level cross-framework language to develop custom components such as layers, models, or metrics that can be used in native workflows in JAX, TensorFlow, or PyTorch — with one codebase." Keras 3 will be the default Keras version for TensorFlow 2.16 onwards, but Keras 2 can still be used.

== History ==
The name 'Keras' derives from the Ancient Greek word κέρας (Keras) meaning 'horn'.

Designed to enable fast experimentation with deep neural networks, Keras focuses on being user-friendly, modular, and extensible. It was developed as part of the research effort of project ONEIROS (Open-ended Neuro-Electronic Intelligent Robot Operating System), and its primary author and maintainer is François Chollet, who was a Google engineer until leaving the company in 2024. Chollet is also the author of the Xception deep neural network model.

Up until version 2.3, Keras supported multiple backends, including TensorFlow, Microsoft Cognitive Toolkit, Theano, and PlaidML.

From version 2.4 up until version 3.0, only TensorFlow was supported. Starting with version 3.0 (as well as its preview version, Keras Core), however, Keras has become multi-backend again, supporting TensorFlow, JAX, and PyTorch. It now also supports OpenVINO.

== Features ==
Keras contains numerous implementations of commonly used neural-network building blocks such as layers, objectives, activation functions, optimizers, and a host of tools for working with image and text data to simplify programming for deep neural networks. The code is hosted on GitHub, and community support forums include the GitHub issues page.

In addition to standard neural networks, Keras has support for convolutional and recurrent neural networks. It supports other common utility layers like dropout, batch normalization, and pooling.

Keras allows users to produce deep models on smartphones (iOS and Android), on the web, or on the Java Virtual Machine. It also allows use of distributed training of deep-learning models on clusters of graphics processing units (GPU) and tensor processing units (TPU).

== See also ==
- Comparison of deep-learning software
