= Glauber (footballer, born 1983) =

Brazilian footballer

Personal information
- Full name: Glauber Rodrigues da Silva
- Date of birth: 11 November 1983 (age 42)
- Place of birth: Barra do Pirai, Brazil
- Height: 1.66 m (5 ft 5 in)
- Position: Midfielder

Youth career
- 2001: Volta Redonda

Senior career*
Years	Team	Apps	(Gls)
2002–2005	Volta Redonda		
2006	Botafogo		
2007–2008	Volta Redonda		
2008	Portuguesa-RJ		
2009	Macaé		
2010	Volta Redonda		
2010	Barra Mansa		
2011–2012	Volta Redonda		
2012	Aracruz		
2012	Tupi		
2013	São José		
2013	Grêmio Barueri		
2013–2014	Volta Redonda	20	(1)
2014	São Cristóvão	17	(6)
2015	C.D. FAS		
- * Club domestic league appearances and goals

Glauber Rodrigues da Silva (born 11 November 1983) commonly known as Glauber, is a Brazilian former professional footballer who played as a midfielder.
