= ADvantage Framework =

Systems engineering software platform

ADvantage Framework is a model-based systems engineering software platform used for a range of activities including building and operating real-time simulation-based lab test facilities for hardware-in-the-loop simulation purposes. ADvantage includes several desktop applications and run-time services software. The ADvantage run-time services combine a Real-Time Operating System (RTOS) layered on top of commercial computer equipment such as single board computers or standard PCs. The ADvantage tools include a development environment, a run-time environment, a plotting and analysis tool set, a fault insertion control application, and a vehicle network configuration and management tool that runs on a Windows or Linux desktop or laptop PC. The ADvantage user base is composed mainly of aerospace, defense, and naval/marine companies and academic researchers. Recent ADvantage real-time applications involved research and development of power systems applications including microgrid/smartgrid control and All-Electric Ship applications.

== History ==
With roots in analog computer systems used for real-time applications where digital computers could not meet low-latency computational requirements, Applied Dynamics International moved from proprietary hardware architectures to commercial computing equipment over several decades. The Real-Time Station (RTS) was Applied Dynamics first entry into using Commercial Off The Shelf (COTS) computer hardware. Included with the sale of the RTS was the Applied Dynamics software package called "SIMsystem". In 2001, version 7.0 of SIMsystem was released. From 2001 to 2006 Applied Dynamics reworked their software and hardware products to make better use of COTS processors, computer boards, open source software technology and to better abstract software components from the hardware equipment. In 2006, Applied Dynamics announced a beta release of the "ADvantage Framework". The ADvantage brand provided an umbrella for the disparate software components that were formerly included in the SIMsystem package and offered a single software environment to support VME, PC-based, and desktop real-time simulation activities.

== Open source components ==
ADvantage Framework makes heavy use of open source software technology. Open source software components used include:

- GNU Compiler Collection
- GNU Make
- Python (programming language)
- wxWidgets
- Linux

== Release history ==
ADvantage Framework version 8.3.x

Version	Release date
8.3.2m	20 Feb 2013
8.3.2j	13 Nov 2012
8.3.2g	19 Jun 2012
8.3.2f	10 May 2012
8.3.2e	8 Feb 2012
8.3.2d	29 Nov 2011
8.3.2c	9 Nov 2011
8.3.2b	3 Oct 2011
8.3.2a	6 Sep 2011
8.3.2	15 Aug 2011

ADvantage SAS version 9.0.x

Version	Release date
9.0.2.3	15 Nov 2012
9.0.2.2	3 Aug 2012
9.0.2.1	16 May 2012
9.0.2.0	20 Apr 2012
