= Pungi (software) =

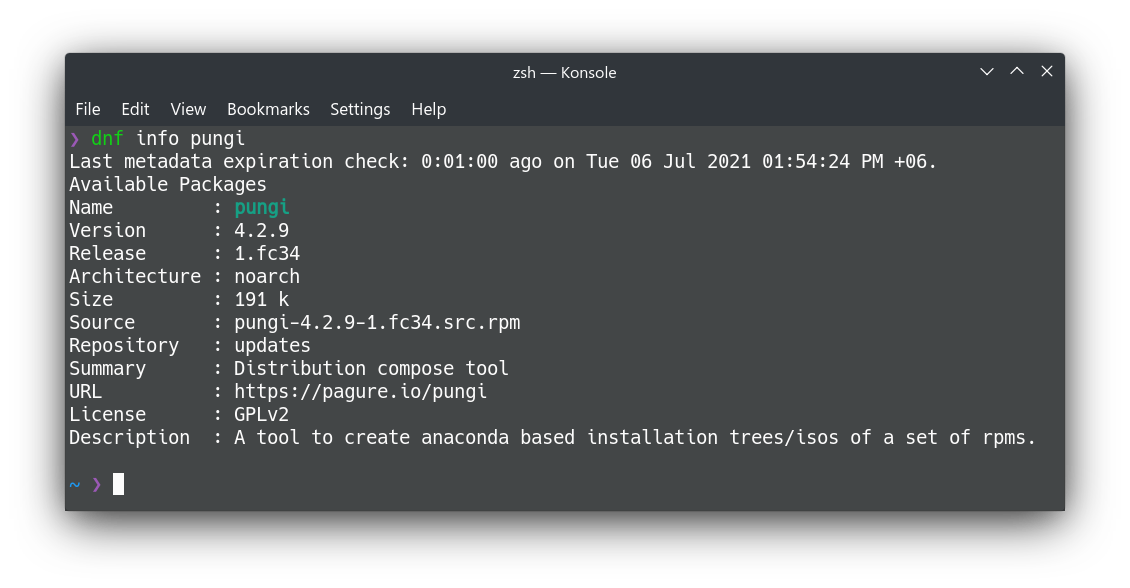
- DNF Info is showing a details about Pungi
- Developer: Pungi Developer
- Release: Pungi-0.1.0-1 (9 November 2006; 20 years ago)
- Stable release: 4.2.9 (29 April 2021; 5 years ago)
- Written in: Python
- Platform: Linux
- License: GPL v2
- Website: https://pagure.io/pungi
- Repository: https://pagure.io/pungi/tree/master

Pungi is a program for making spins of Fedora (Linux distribution), from the release 7 upwards. Pungi is mainly a distribution compose tool. It consists of multiple separate executables backed by a common library.

== Origin of name ==
The name Pungi comes from the instrument used to charm snakes. Anaconda being the software Pungi was manipulating, and anaconda being a snake, led to the referential naming.

The first name, which was suggested by Seth Vidal, was FIST, Fedora Installation <Something> Tool. That name was quickly discarded and replaced with Pungi.
