= Quixote (web framework) =

Software development framework

- Developers: Andrew Kuchling, Neil Schemenauer and Greg Ward
- Release: 12 August 2000; 26 years ago
- Stable release: 3.8 / July 21, 2026; 3 months ago
- Written in: Python
- Operating system: Cross-platform
- Type: Web framework
- License: MIT License
- Repository: github.com/nascheme/quixote

Quixote is a software framework for developing web applications in Python. Quixote "is based on a simple, flexible design, making it possible to write applications quickly and to benefit from the wide range of available third-party Python modules".

A Quixote application is typically a Python package, a collection of modules grouped into a single directory tree. Quixote then maps a URL to a function or method inside the Python package; the function is then called with the contents of the HTTP request, and the results are returned to the client.

== See also ==
- Comparison of web frameworks
