= PlaidML =

Open source tensor compiler

- Original author(s): Vertex.AI
- Developer(s): Intel
- Initial release: 20 October 2017; 7 years ago
- Operating system: Linux, Mac OS, Microsoft Windows
- Type: Tensor compiler
- License: Apache License 2.0
- Website: github.com/plaidml/plaidml

PlaidML is a portable tensor compiler. Tensor compilers bridge the gap between the universal mathematical descriptions of deep learning operations, such as convolution, and the platform and chip-specific code needed to perform those operations with good performance. Internally, PlaidML makes use of the Tile eDSL to generate OpenCL, OpenGL, LLVM, or CUDA code. It enables deep learning on devices where the available computing hardware is either not well supported or the available software stack contains only proprietary components. For example, it does not require the usage of CUDA or cuDNN on Nvidia hardware, while achieving comparable performance.

PlaidML supports the machine learning libraries Keras, ONNX, and nGraph. However, Keras have dropped support of multiple backends and latest Keras version isn't compatible with PlaidML. An integration with Tensorflow-Keras is planned as a replacement for Keras.

== History ==
In August 2018 Intel acquired Vertex.AI, a startup whose mission statement was “deep learning for every platform”. Intel released PlaidML as free software under to the terms of the Apache Licence (version 2.0) to improve compatibility with nGraph, TensorFlow, and other ecosystem software.
