= Hod Lipson =

American robotics engineer (born 1967)

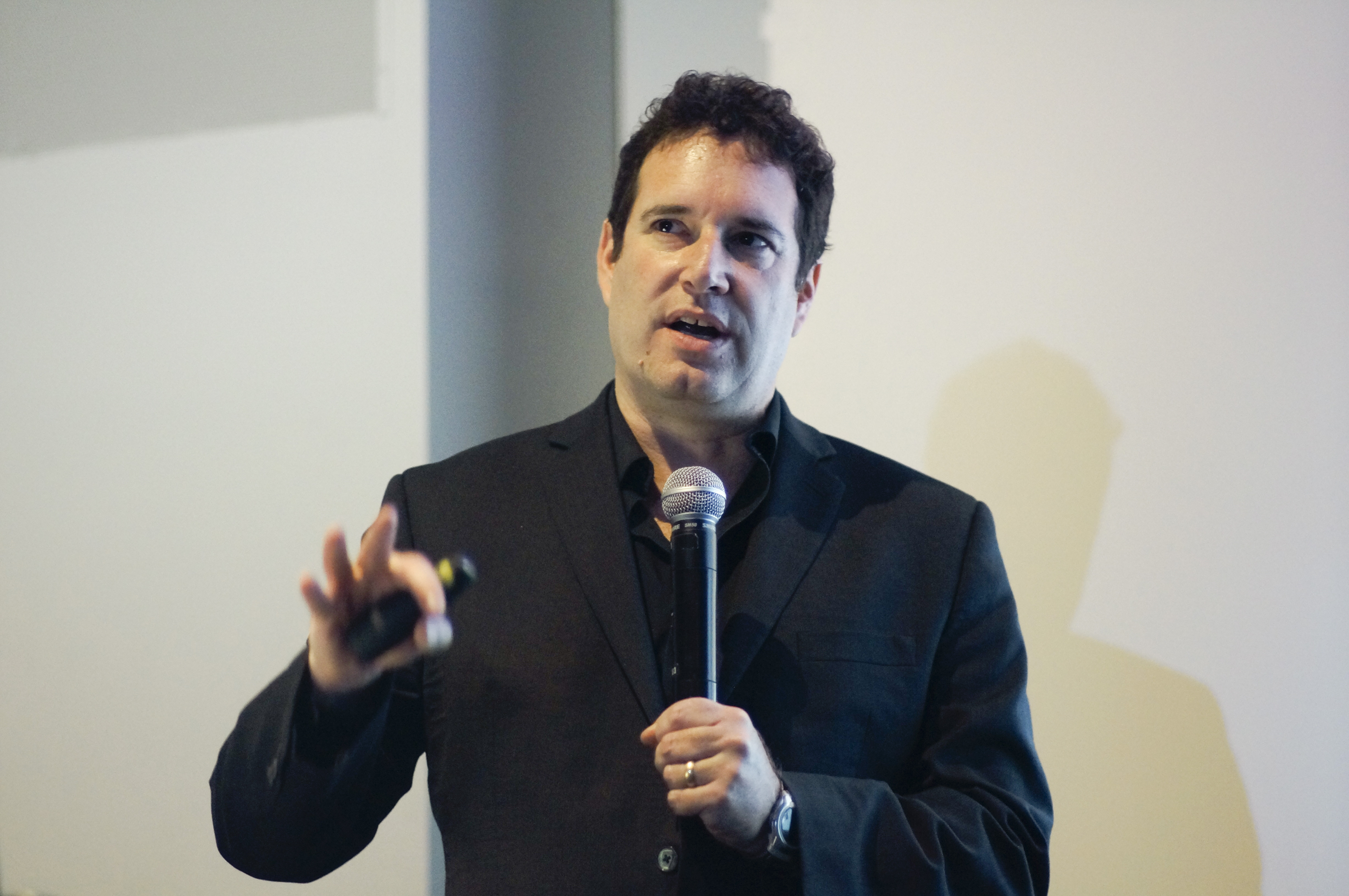
- Hod Lipson in 2013
- Born: 1967 (age 58–59); Haifa, Israel
- Citizenship: American
- Education: Technion (B.Sc. 1989, Ph.D. 1998)
- Known for: Fab@Home, Self aware robots, self replicating robots
- Scientific career
- Fields: Robotics, Artificial Intelligence, Mechanical Engineering
- Workplaces: MIT, Brandeis University, Cornell, Columbia
- Doctoral advisor: Moshe Shpitalni

Hod Lipson (born 1967) is an American Professor and robotics engineer. He is the director of Columbia University's Creative Machines Lab. Lipson's work focuses on evolutionary robotics, digital manufacturing, artificial life, and creating machines that can demonstrate some aspects of human creativity and Self Awareness. His publications have been cited more than 60,000 times, and he has an h-index of 95, as of 1 July 2026. Lipson is interviewed in the 2018 documentary on artificial intelligence Do You Trust This Computer?

== Biography ==
Lipson received B.Sc. (1989) and Ph.D. (1998) degrees in Mechanical Engineering from The Technion Israel Institute of Technology. Before joining the faculty of Columbia University in 2015, he was a professor at Cornell University for 14 years. Prior to Cornell, he was a postdoctoral researcher in the Computer Science Department at Brandeis University, and a lecturer at MIT's Mechanical Engineering Department.

== Research ==
Lipson has been involved with machine learning and robotics throughout his career. He presented his "self-aware" and "self replicating" robots at the 2007 TED conference., claiming that ultimately, robots will grow, learn and adapt much like biological lifeorms.

Lipson's academic career was launched in August 2000 with the publication of an article in Nature on the "Automatic design and fabrication of robotic lifeforms", through the use of two technologies that were nascent at the time: generative AI and 3D printing. He argued that Machine Learning and Digital Manufacturing technologies will ultimately emancipate robotics and enable a new form of non-biological life. The rapid evolution of these technologies in subsequent decades has proven this prediction to be largely correct.

=== Robot Self-Reproduction and Machine Metabolism ===
in 2006, Lipson and his students pioneered research in the area of machine Self reproduction, demonstrating a robot capable of building a copy of itself from components. While many claimed that self-reproduction is a unique attribute of biological life, Lipson argued that self reproduction can be attained by machines, if they are provided the necessary materials, energy, and environmental conditions, and in this sense are similar to biological systems. In 2025, Lipson and his team further expanded the concept of robot self-reproduction, self-repair, and physical self-adaptation into the broader concept of Machine Metabolism. This notion captures the idea of machines that can autonomously adapt and maintain their bodies by reusing parts from other machines. Lipson argued that ultimately, as robots become ubiquitous and independent, they will inevitably have to learn to self-repair, self-adapt and self-reproduce, into order to sustain a viable robotic ecology.

=== Robot Self Awareness ===
In research on robotic self-awareness, Lipson advocates "self-simulation" as preliminary stage. Lipson argues that Self Awareness is essentially "the ability to imagine oneself in the future". Further, the longer the further into the future that an entity is capable of imagining itself, the more 'Self-Aware' it is. This creates a continuum of self-awareness levels, in contrast with more binary definitions. He also argued that the ability to imagine oneself in the future presents a strategic advantage and therefore is an evolvable trait. Lipson and his students have demonstrated a series of robots capable of imagining themselves with increasing fidelity and over longer horizon, arguing that self-awareness is an inevitable consequence of embodied intelligence.

=== Automating Scientific Discovery ===
Beginning in 2007, Lipson and his Cornell University students Josh Bongard and Michael Schmidt developed a series of software algorithms based on ideas of co-evolution aimed at discovering symbolic, human-interpretable scientific laws of nature. The work culminated in a software named Eureqa capable of deriving equations, mathematical relationships and laws of nature from sets of data: for instance, deriving Newton's second law of motion from a data set of positions and velocities of a double pendulum. Many variations of this approach were later explored. At Columbia, Lipson and coauthors extended the approach to discovering the variables underlying physical phenomena. Lipson argued that discovering physical laws is predicated on first discovering the physical variables themselves, and thus variable discovery is a more fundamental problem that precedes the discovery of any symbolic law. Lipson argues that the automation of scientific discovery will ultimately be the only way to sustain scientific progress.

=== Other notable works ===
Additional accomplishment include:

- Fab@Home -- The first US open-source 3D printer
- The Jamming Gripper - Using jamming phenomena for creating robotic grippers
- PIX18 - Automated artistic robot specializing in oil painting
- AI for Powder Crystallography - Lipson and collaborators created the first end-to-end system to solve Powder Crystallography, in a tribute to his grandfather Henry Lipson's pioneering work on X-Ray Crystallography a century earlier.
- Popular Science Books - Lipson coauthored two books with Melba Kurman - Fabricated (2013) and Driverless (2016), translated to 7 languages and sold over 250,000 copies combined.
- Transfer Learning - Lipson and his students pioneered early work on Transfer Learning, culminating with the highly cited paper on the topic with Yoshua Bengio
