= TomoPy =

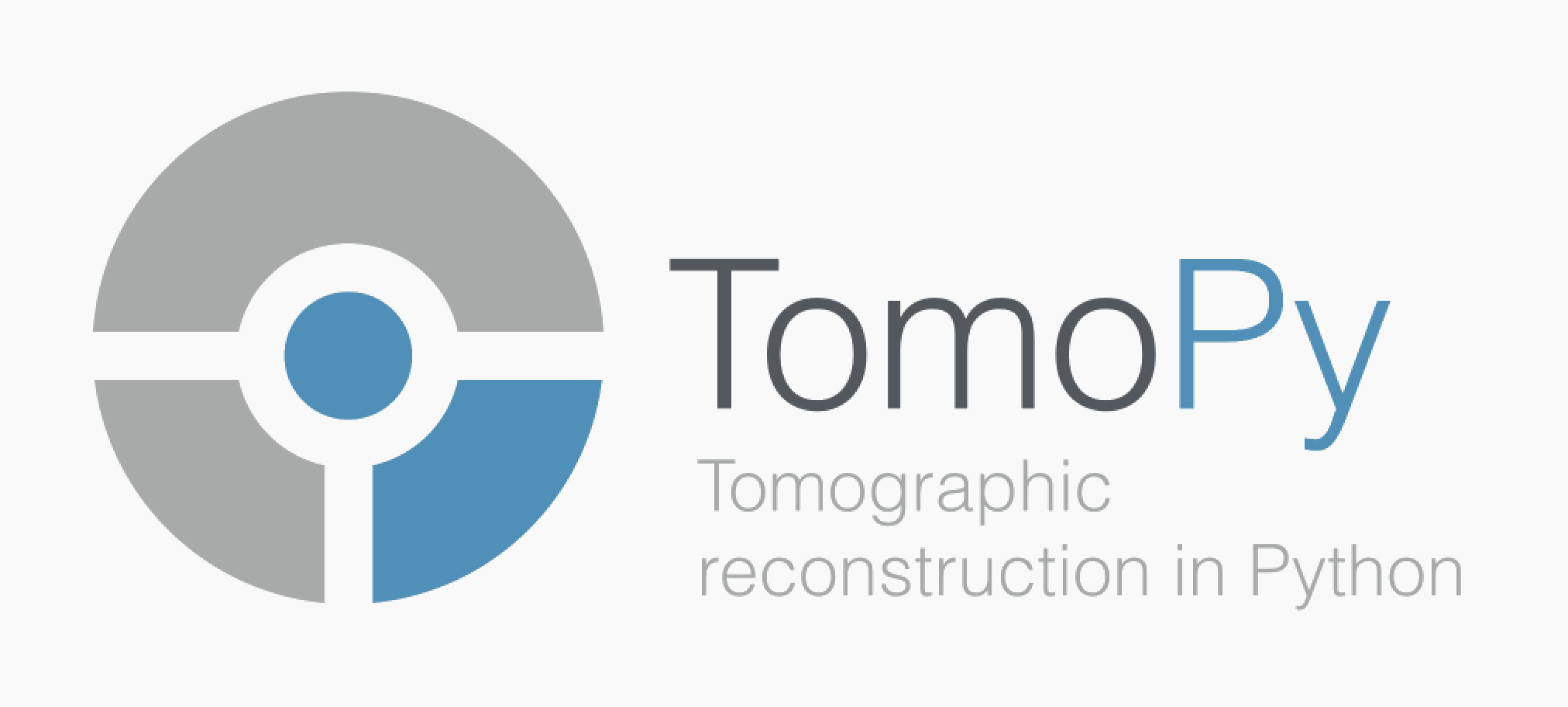
- Original author: Doga Gursoy
- Developer: Community project
- Stable release: 1.15.3 / 3 October 2025; 3 months ago
- Repository: github.com/tomopy/tomopy
- Written in: Python, C
- Operating system: Linux, OS X
- Type: Image processing
- License: BSD-3
- Website: tomopy.readthedocs.org

TomoPy is an open-sourced Python toolbox to perform tomographic data processing and image reconstruction.

== Overview ==
Tomographic reconstruction creates three-dimensional views of an object by combining two-dimensional images taken from multiple directions, for example in how a computer-aided tomography scanner allows 3D views of the heart or brain. Data collection can be rapid, but the required computations are massive. Further, many common experimental perturbations can degrade the quality of tomographs, unless corrections are applied. Unless automated tools make these corrections, beamline staff can be overwhelmed by data that can be collected far faster than corrections and reconstruction can be performed.

To address the needs for image correction and tomographic reconstruction in an instrument independent manner, the TomoPy code was developed, which is a parallelizable high performance tomography library.
