= Eureqa =

Modeling engine for datasets

- Owners: Datarobot, Inc.
- Creators: Michael Schmidt and Hod Lipson
- Website: www.datarobot.com
- Commercial: Yes
- Launched: November 2009
- Current status: Active

Eureqa was a proprietary modeling engine created in Cornell's Artificial Intelligence Lab and later commercialized by Nutonian, Inc. The software used genetic algorithms to determine mathematical equations that describe sets of data in their simplest form, a technique referred to as symbolic regression.

== Origin and development ==
Since the 1970s, the primary way companies had performed data science was to hire data scientists and equip them with tools like R, Python, SAS, and SQL to execute predictive and statistical modeling. In 2007 Michael Schmidt, then a PhD student in Computational Biology at Cornell, along with his advisor Hod Lipson, developed Eureqa to help automate the curve fitting work of data scientists by creating a tool that would automatically search for the "best" mathematical model to fit a given dataset (where best is defined as the simplest model that can be found to achieve a given level of fit to the data).

In November 2009 the program was made available to download as freeware. Lipson described the tool's benefit as dealing with fields that are overwhelmed with data but lack theory to explain it. In the October 2011 edition of "Physical Biology", Lipson described a yeast experiment that predicted seven known equations. This took place after Lipson had asked scientists from different disciplines to share their work to test Eureqa's versatility.

== Technology ==
Eureqa worked by creating random equations with the data through evolutionary search. Initial guesses might not fit the data well but some of the equations will fit better than others and those will be used as the basis for the next round of guesses until the fit cannot be further improved.

== Reception and use ==
Over 80,000 users downloaded the program. People used the application for many uses including analyzing the herding of cattle and modeling the behavior of the stock market.

In 2017 Nutonian was acquired by DataRobot and Eureqa merged into their payware portfolio.
