= Glauber (crater) =

Crater on the Moon

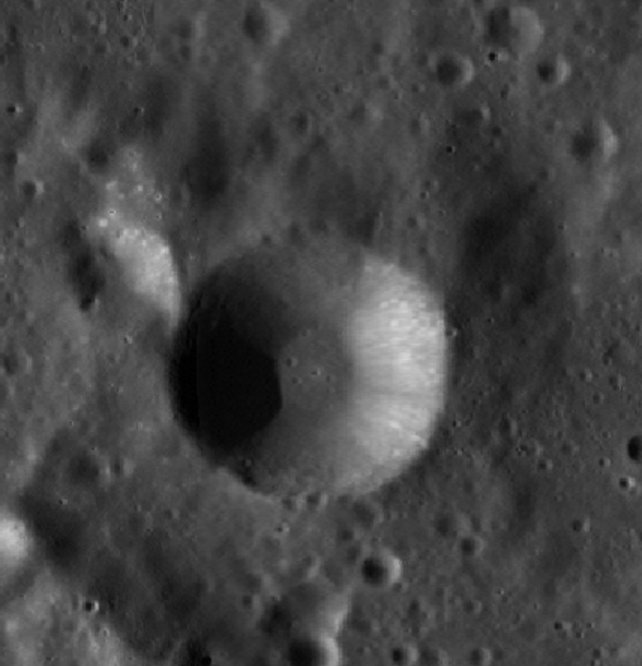
- LRO mosaic
- Coordinates: 11.5°N 142.6°E
- Diameter: 15 km
- Depth: Unknown
- Colongitude: 218° at sunrise
- Eponym: Johann R. Glauber

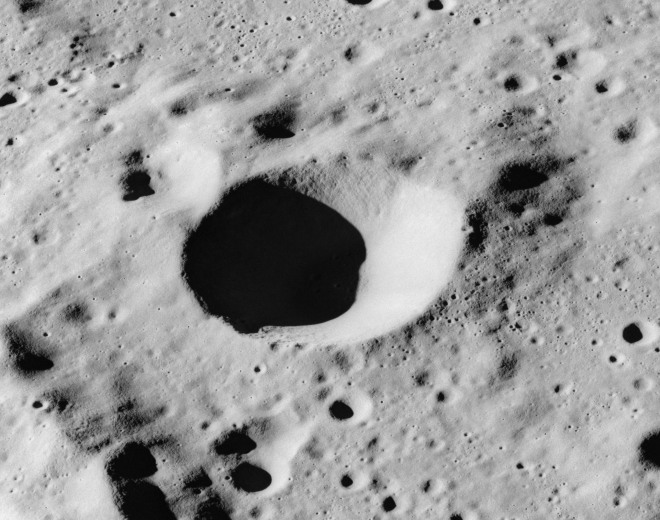
Apollo 16 image

Glauber is a small lunar impact crater that is located just to the north of a large walled plain called Mendeleev, on the Moon's far side. This crater lies just outside the irregular rim of Mendeleev, but well within the outer skirt of ejecta. It is a circular crater with a rim that has not been significantly eroded. The simple inner walls slope down to a small floor at the midpoint with a peak at the center. The diameter of the floor is only about one-third that of the crater.
