= Spyce (software) =

Python-based templating system

- Website: spyce.sourceforge.net

Spyce is technology similar to PHP that can be used to embed Python code into webpages. Spyce is free software, distributed under a BSD-style licence, with some additional restrictions about documentation notices.

== Common Spyce embedding methods ==
Since Python uses indentation to determine the beginning and end of a block, Spyce includes several ways to embed Python code. Shown below are the three most common ways. Spyce supports ASP/JSP-style delimiters (<% and %>) as well as double braces ([[ and ]])

1. Python 'chunks' (multiple Python statements with traditional indentation):
  It's <b>[[\

from time import asctime, localtime
print(asctime(localtime()))

]]</b> right now!
  or
  It's <b><%\

from time import asctime, localtime
print(asctime(localtime()))

%></b> right now!
2. Individual statements within delimiters (indentation not required):
   [[for x in xrange(3): { ]]
 <b>Hello, </b>
 [[} ]]
  or
   <% for x in xrange(3): { %>
 <b>Hello, </b>
 <% } %>
3. Expressions evaluation
  <b>I am [[= 5*3 ]] years old.</b>
  or
  <b>I am <%= 5*3 %> years old.</b>

The techniques above can be freely mixed and embedded in any HTML document.

Any legal Python code can be embedded and any Python module can be imported, which makes it especially suited for writing very robust applications (using exception handling and unit testing single modules individually).

== Features ==
Some other features include custom tags (ala JSP), spyce lambdas and active handlers (reminiscent of ASP).

== Requirements ==
Spyce brings Python's standard library and the programming language itself to the web. The minimum requirement is a working Python installation (it ships with a standalone web server written in Python that can be used during development), although it can be used in conjunction with several web servers such as Apache and IIS in a variety of ways.

Configuration is performed using Python modules that are imported by the web server during the initialization process. Consequentially, only a fundamental understanding of Python is required to begin working with Spyce.

== See also ==
- mod_python
