= SQLObject =

- Original author: Ian Bicking
- Developer: Oleg Broytman
- Release: October 2002; 24 years ago
- Stable release: 3.14.0 / October 16, 2026; 0 days ago
- Written in: Python
- Operating system: Cross-platform
- Type: Object–relational mapping
- License: LGPL
- Website: sqlobject.org

SQLObject is a Python object–relational mapper between a SQL database and Python objects. It is experiencing community popularity, and forms a part of many applications (e.g., TurboGears). It is very similar to Ruby on Rails' ActiveRecord in operation in that it uses class definitions to form table schemas, and utilizes the language's reflection and dynamism to be useful.

SQLObject supports a number of common database backends: included in the distribution are MariaDB, MySQL, PostgreSQL, SQLite, Sybase SQL Server, MaxDB, Microsoft SQL Server and Firebird.

The first version of SQLObject was publicly released in October 2002.

== See also ==
- TurboGears
- SQLAlchemy
- Storm
