= CheetahTemplate =

Template engine software

- Original author: Tavis Rudd
- Developer: Oleg Broytman
- Initial release: June 2001; 24 years ago
- Stable release: 3.4.0.post5 / November 29, 2025; 24 days ago
- Preview release: 3.4.1a0 / December 2, 2024; 12 months ago
- Written in: Python
- Operating system: Cross-platform
- Type: Template processor
- License: MIT License
- Website: cheetahtemplate.org

Cheetah (or CheetahTemplate) is a template engine that uses the Python programming language. It can be used standalone or combined with other tools and frameworks. It is often used for server-side scripting and dynamic web content by generating HTML, but can also be used to generate source code. Cheetah is free open-source software licensed under the MIT License.

Templating engines encourage clean separation of content, graphic design, and program code. This leads to more modular, flexible, and reusable site architectures, shorter development time, and code that is easier to understand and maintain. Cheetah compiles templates into optimized, yet readable, Python code. It gives template authors full access to any Python data, and functionality, while providing a way for administrators to selectively restrict access to Python when needed.

Cheetah is included in the FreeBSD Ports collection and several Linux distributions: Gentoo, Fedora, Debian, and Ubuntu among others.

== Example of Cheetah code ==
#from Cheetah.Template import Template
#extends Template

#set $people = [{'name' : 'Tom', 'mood' : 'Happy'}, {'name' : 'Dick',
                        'mood' : 'Sad'}, {'name' : 'Harry', 'mood' : 'Hairy'}]

<strong>How are you feeling?</strong>
<ul>
    #for $person in $people
        <li>
            $person['name'] is $person['mood']
        </li>
    #end for
</ul>
