= Comparison of user interface markup languages =

The following tables compare general and technical information for some user interface markup languages. Please see the individual markup languages' articles for further information.

== General information ==
Basic general information about the markup languages: creator, version, etc.

	Creator	License	First public release date	Latest stable version	development environment	Runtime environment
avg	Ulrich von Zadow	Free, LGPL	2003	1.0.0	text editor or Eclipse	Python
FXML	Oracle Corporation	?	October 2011		Netbeans	JavaFX
GladeXML	GNOME	Free, LGPL	April 1998	2.10.0	Glade	GTK+
GNUstep Renaissance	GNUstep	Free, LGPL	April 2001 (base)	0.9.0	Gorm, ProjectCenter	GNUstep
LZX	Laszlo Systems	Free, CPL	July 2003	4.9	optional (e.g., text editor, Eclipse IDE available)	Flash Player 5 or above, DHTML, Java ME announced
MXML	Adobe Systems	Free, MPL 1.1	March 2004	2.0.1	Adobe Flex or free Flex 3 SDK	Flash Player 9 or above
Qt Designer	Qt Project, The Qt Company	Free, LGPL	?	5.9	Qt Designer	Qt
QuiX	inno:script	Proprietary, commercial	June 2005	0.5	Quill UI Designer	Internet Explorer, Mozilla based browsers
UIML	OASIS	?	December 1997	?	various	jUIML, UIML.Net, various
XAML	Microsoft	Free, Ms-PL	November 2006	v2009	optional (e.g., text editor), Microsoft Expression Blend, Microsoft Expression Design, Visual Studio 2008, Vectropy	.NET Framework 3.0 or above (formerly WinFX), XBAPs for WPF and plugins for Silverlight in web browsers
XRC	wxWidgets	Free, wxWindows Library	?	wxWidgets 2.8.12	optional (e.g., text editor), wxGlade, XRCed, wxDesigner, DialogBlocks	wxWidgets-based applications
XUL	Mozilla Foundation	Free, MPL	December 1998	1.0	optional (e.g., text editor)	Gecko-based applications
XFD (user interface)	Abbott Informatics	?	2004		JScript .NET, JavaScript	STARLIMS v 10-11
XForms	World Wide Web Consortium	Free, W3C	14 March 2006	1.0	optional (e.g., text editor)	Many implementations in browsers, plug-ins, extensions, and servers
ZUML	Potix	free, GPL, commercial	November 2005	2.4.0	text editor or Eclipse	Ajax ZK Framework
	Creator	License	First public release date	Latest stable version	development environment	Runtime environment

== Features ==
Some features of the markup languages.

	Programming language	Treatment	Web standard
GladeXML	C, C++, C#, Python, Ada, Pike, Perl, PHP, Eiffel, Ruby, D	Interpreted, compiled for some languages (deprecated)	XML
GNUstep Renaissance	Objective-C	Compiled, dynamic binding	XML
LZX	XML, ECMAScript	Compiled	XML, ECMAScript, CSS, XPath
MXML	ActionScript	Compiled	XML, ECMAScript, CSS
Qt/QML	C++, JavaScript (Plus many more by third party support)	Compiled, interpreted	XML
QuiX	JavaScript	Interpreted	XML, CSS, JavaScript
UIML	Various	Various	?
XAML	Browser (Silverlight); JavaScript, IronPython, IronRuby, C#, VB.NET, C++/CLI, and J# among others.	Interpreted, compiled	XML, XPath, DOM, JavaScript
XRC	C++, Python (wxPython), Perl (wxPerl), C# and other .NET languages (wx.NET), Erlang (wxErlang)	Various	XML
XUL	JavaScript, Python, C++, Java, Perl	Interpreted, compiled (C++)	XML, CSS, DTD, RDF, XPath, XSLT, DOM, JavaScript (ECMAScript)
ZUML	Java, JavaScript, Ruby, Groovy and Python	Interpreted, compiled	XML, XHTML, CSS
	Programming language	Treatment	Web standard

== See also ==
- List of user interface markup languages
- Adobe Integrated Runtime (AIR)
- Adobe Flex
- JavaFX
- Silverlight, XAML
