= List of user interface markup languages =

The following is a list of user interface markup languages.

== By vendor or platform ==
=== Flash ===
- OpenLaszlo

=== Java ===
- Thinlet
- ZUML Ajax web application UI generator
- FXML/JavaFX

=== Microsoft ===
- XAML
- XPS

=== Mozilla ===
- XUL

=== W3C ===
- XHTML
- XFDL
- XForms

=== Others ===
- Curl - also a programming language
- GladeXML
- UIML
- EMML
- VTML
- XRC - XML Based Resource System is used by wxWidgets
- QML

== Descriptions ==
=== EMML ===
EMML is a declarative Mashup Domain Specific Language (DSL) aimed at creating enterprise mashups. The EMML language provides a rich set of high-level mashup-domain vocabulary to consume and mash variety of Web data-sources in interesting ways. EMML provides a uniform syntax to invoke heterogeneous service styles: REST, WSDL, RSS/ATOM, RDBMS, and POJO. EMML also provides ability to mix and match diverse data-formats : XML, JSON, JDBC, JavaObjects, and primitive types.

=== OpenLaszlo (LZX) ===
OpenLaszlo is a runtime environment that comprises a runtime environment and an interface definition language (Laszlo XML - LZX). LZX is a declarative user interface language which defines the widgets, application layout and scripting elements (using JavaScript) to create your application. LZX is runtime agnostic with the currently supported runtime being within Macromedia/Adobe Flash. An experimental runtime called Laszlo "Legals" that will allow OpenLaszlo (LZX) applications run in multiple runtime environments, such as DHTML/AJAX.

=== SVG ===
Scalable Vector Graphics is a markup language for graphics proposed by the W3C that can support rich graphics for web and mobile applications. While SVG is not a user interface language, it includes support for vector/raster graphics, animation, interaction with the DOM and CSS, embedded media, events and scriptability. When these features are used in combination, rich user interfaces are possible.

SVG can also be super-imposed upon another XML-compatible user interface markup language, such as XUL and XForms, as the graphics-rich portion of a user interface.

=== UIML ===
UIML is the earliest pioneer in user interface markup languages. It is an open standard where implementation is not restricted to a single vendor. However, it doesn't attract much attention.

=== XAML ===
XAML is a markup system that underlies user interface components of Microsoft's .NET Framework 3.0 and above. Its scope is more ambitious than that of most user interface markup languages, since program logic and styles are also embedded in the XAML document. Functionally, it can be seen as a combination of XUL, SVG, CSS, and JavaScript into a single XML schema.

Some people are critical of this design, as many standards (such as those already listed) exist for doing these things. However, it is expected to be developed with a visual tool where developers do not even need to understand the underlying markups.

=== XUL ===
The primary interface language of Mozilla Foundation products is XUL. XUL documents are rendered by the Gecko engine, which also renders XHTML and SVG documents. It cooperates with many existing standards and technologies, including CSS, JavaScript, DTD and RDF, which makes it relatively easy to learn for people with background of web programming and design.

=== Other ===
Other markup languages incorporated into existing frameworks are:

- VTML for Macromedia HomeSite

Some of these are compiled into binary forms.

In avionics, the ARINC 661 standard prescribes a binary format to define user interfaces in glass cockpits.

== See also ==
- Comparison of user interface markup languages
