= Graphical user interface builder =

Software development tool

NetBeans GUI builder

A graphical user interface builder (or GUI builder), also known as GUI designer or sometimes rapid application development (RAD) integrated development environment (IDE), is a software development tool that simplifies creating graphical user interfaces (GUIs) by allowing a designer to arrange graphical control elements (often called widgets) using a drag-and-drop WYSIWYG editor. Without a GUI builder, a GUI must be built by manually specifying each widget's parameters in the source code, with no visual feedback until the program is run.

User interfaces are commonly programmed using an event-driven architecture, so GUI builders also simplify creating event-driven code. This supporting code connects software widgets with the outgoing and incoming events that trigger the functions providing the application logic.

Some graphical user interface builders automatically generate all the source code for a graphical control element. Others, like Interface Builder or Glade Interface Designer, generate serialized object instances that are then loaded by the application.

== List of GUI builders ==
=== C language based ===
- GTK, Glade Interface Designer
- Motif
- XForms (toolkit) fdesign
- Intrinsics

=== C# based ===
- UWP, Windows Presentation Foundation, WinForms
  - Microsoft Visual Studio XAML Editor, XAML based GUI layout
  - Microsoft Expression Blend
  - SharpDevelop
- Xamarin.Forms, .NET
  - Xamarin Studio

=== C++ based ===
- UWP, Windows Presentation Foundation, WinForms
  - Microsoft Visual Studio XAML Editor, XAML based GUI layout
  - Microsoft Blend
- Qt (software)
  - Qt Creator
- FLTK
  - FLUID
- JUCE
- U++
- wxWidgets
  - wxFormBuilder

=== Objective-C, Swift based ===
- Cocoa (modern, formerly OpenStep) and Carbon (deprecated).
  - Xcode
- GNUstep
  - Gorm

=== Java based ===
- Android Studio, XML-based GUI layout
- NetBeans GUI design tool

=== HTML–JavaScript based ===
- Adobe Dreamweaver

=== Object Pascal based ===
- Delphi, Visual Component Library (VCL)
- Lazarus, Lazarus Component Library (LCL)

=== Tk framework based ===
- Tk (software) for Tcl
  - Komodo Edit (No longer has a GUI builder)

=== Visual Basic based ===
- UWP, Windows Presentation Foundation, WinForms
  - Microsoft Visual Studio XAML Editor, XAML based GUI layout
  - Microsoft Expression Blend

=== Other tools ===
- Adobe Animate
- App Inventor for Android
- AutoIt
- Creately
- Embedded Wizard
- GEM
- Interface Builder
- LucidChart
- OpenWindows
- Resource construction set
- Stetic
- Scaleform
- Wavemaker

== List of development environments ==
=== IDEs with GUI builders (RAD IDEs) ===
- 4D
- Komodo Edit (No longer has a GUI builder)
- Android Studio
- Anjuta
- AutoIt3
- C++Builder
- Clarion
- Code::Blocks
- CodeLite
- dBase
- Delphi/RAD Studio
- Embedded Wizard
- Eclipse
- Gambas
- IntelliJ IDEA
- InForm
- JDeveloper
- KDevelop
- LabWindows/CVI
- LANSA
- Lazarus
- Liberty BASIC
- Microsoft Visual Studio
- MonoDevelop
- MSEide+MSEgui
- MyEclipse
- NetBeans
- OutSystems
- PascalABC.NET
- Projucer
- Purebasic
- Qt Creator
- SharpDevelop
- Softwell Maker
- U++
- VB6
- WinFBE
- Xcode
- Xojo

== See also ==
- Model–view–controller
- Web template system
- Rapid application development (RAD)
- Human interface guidelines (HIG)
- Human interface device
- User interface markup language
- User interface modeling
- Linux on the desktop
