= Fabio Paternò =

Italian computer scientist (born 1960)

Academic background
- Education: University of York

Academic work
- Discipline: Computer science
- Sub-discipline: User interface modeling, end-user development

Fabio Paternò is Research Director and Head of the Laboratory on Human Interfaces in Information Systems at Istituto di Scienza e Tecnologie dell'Informazione, Consiglio Nazionale delle Ricerche in Pisa, Italy.

== Career ==
He received his PhD in Computer Science from University of York. He wrote one book on Model-Based Design and Evaluation of Interactive Applications, and has long been working on user interface modeling languages, and tools for design, development or evaluation of interactive systems. In the field of Task analysis he developed the ConcurTaskTrees notation for specifying task models, which has inspired the W3C document on Task Models. He then worked on the TERESA and MARIA XML languages for the logical description of multi-device user interfaces.

He was co-chair of the World Wide Web Consortium (W3C) Group on Model-based User Interfaces.

He was the chair of the International Federation for Information Processing's WG 2.7/13.4 group on user interface engineering.

He was a pioneer in the area of methods and tools for automatic support for usability evaluation (see 1998 article on Automatic support for usability evaluation published in IEEE Transactions on Software Engineering). This research line produced a set of tools (including MUSE, WUP and WebRemUSINE) that perform semantic analyses of the information contained in the detected client-side logs of user sessions in order to help evaluators identify potential usability problems. Some of them have also been used in industrial projects.

He addressed research issues related to multi-device environments by proposing original solutions for migratory and cross-device user interfaces, which allow seamless access through a variety of devices ranging from wearable to large public displays, and dynamic allocation of interactive components across them. He also edited and wrote part of a book on Migratory Interactive Applications for Ubiquitous Environments.

He has also investigated novel solutions for End-User development in various contexts. He coordinated a European Network of Excellence (EUD-net), co-edited (together with Henry Lieberman from MIT, and Volker Wulf from University of Siegen) one of the best-known books on End User Development (widely cited), and carried out various research studies in the area. He has actively worked at the design of various authoring environments and tools, such as Puzzle for intuitively editing interactive applications from a smartphone, a mashup tool for creating new Web applications by composing existing components using the familiar copy-paste interaction across them.

More recently, he has focused on allowing the customisation of applications for the Internet of Things and humanoid robots, allowing even non-experts to create automations able to connect events detected through various types of sensors with actions that change the state of objects and applications.

He has been a member of the Programme Committee of the main international HCI conferences, including Papers Co-Chair of the ACM CHI 2000 conference, IFIP INTERACT 2003 and IFIP INTERACT 2005, and chair of MobileHCI 2002, EICS 2011, Ambient Intelligence 2012, ACM EICS 2014, Mobile HCI 2016, MUM 2019, ACM IUI 2020, and ACM IUI 2025

== Awards ==
In 2009, he was appointed an ACM Distinguished Member.

He has been awarded the IFIP Silver Core in 2013, and the TC13 Pioneer in HCI in 2014, IFIP Fellow in recognition of substantial and enduring contributions in the ICT field in 2020, and has been elected in the ACM SIGCHI Academy in 2021.
