= SavaJe =

Software for mobile phones

SavaJe Technologies
- Type: Private
- Industry: Computer hardware, software
- Founded: 1999
- Defunct: 2006
- Headquarters: Chelmsford, Massachusetts, USA

SavaJe Technologies (pronounced savage) developed the SavaJe OS, a Java OS for advanced mobile phones. Its name is derived from swapping the letters "J" and "S" in "Java SE". The SavaJe OS was a monolithic OS-and-Java platform, an implementation of Sun Microsystems' Java Standard Edition, as opposed to the more limited Micro Edition usually offered on mobile phones. The SavaJe Java platform included a full implementation of Java Swing, enabling developers to create applications with richer user interfaces.

At the 2006 JavaOne conference, their Jasper S20 phone was the "Device of Show".

In April 2007 Sun Microsystems announced their intention to buy the intellectual property assets of SavaJe; these assets were used in the now defunct JavaFX Mobile product, which was unrelated to the JavaFX UI technology released by Oracle.

In August 2010, Oracle sued Google for infringement of Java-related copyrights and patents. In September 2010, the Mass High Tech Journal reported that the inspiration of Android technology has strong ties to the creation and development of the SavaJe platform.
