= XL-Viewer 5000 =

2015 smartphone for use by the elderly

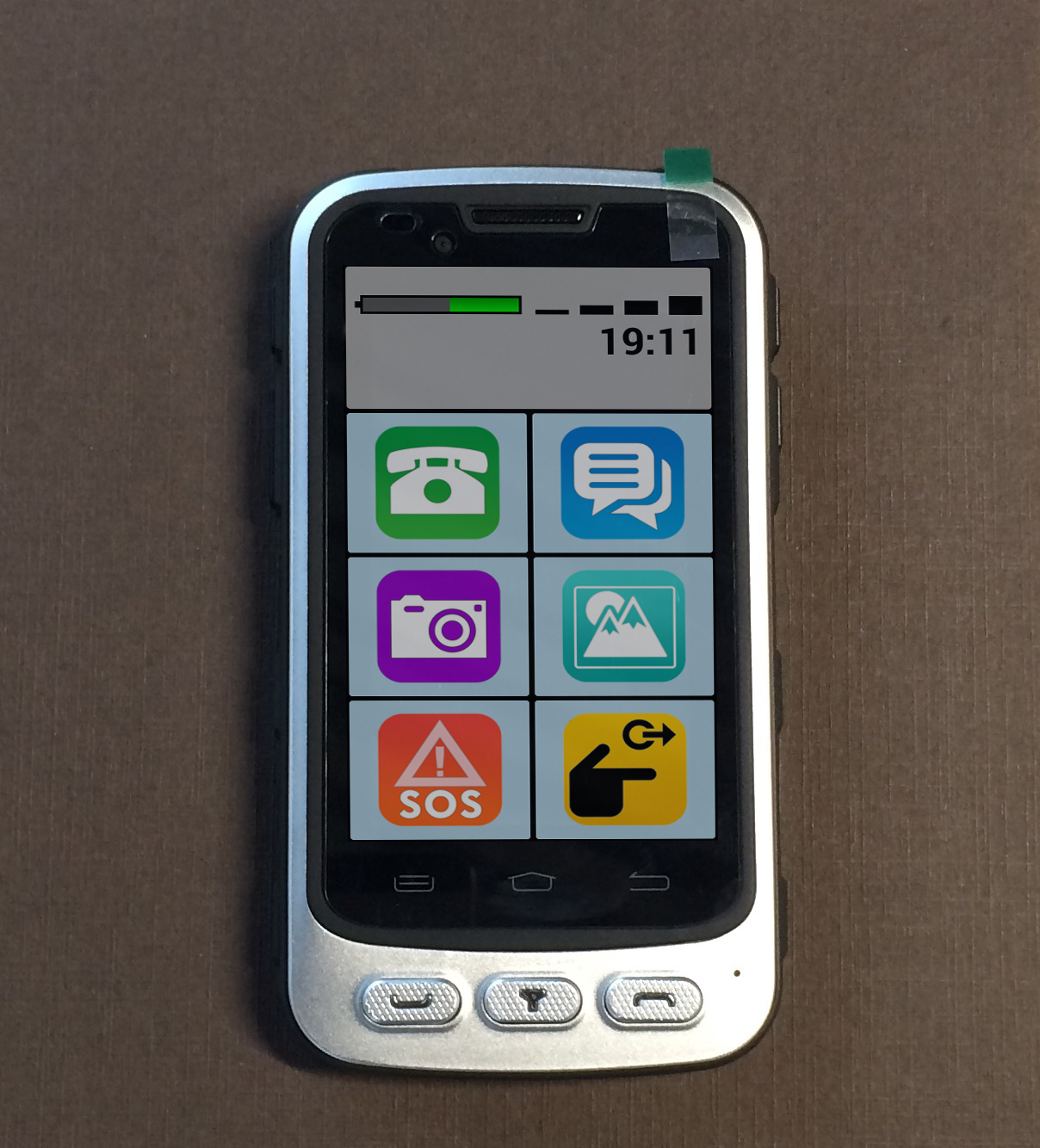
- Senior smartphone
- Manufacturer: X-Systems
- Type: Senior elderly smartphone
- First released: July 10 - 2015
- Compatible networks: 2G, 3G+, EDGE, WAP, GPS, HSPA
- Dimensions: 140 mm (5.5 in) H 72 mm (2.8 in) W 16.5 mm (0.65 in) D
- Weight: 194 g (7 oz) (0.428 lb)
- Operating system: Nucleus RTOS or Android
- CPU: 1GHz MTK6572AX Dual Core
- Memory: 512MB RAM
- Storage: 4 GB Flash
- Removable storage: Additional memory up to 32 GB microSDXC
- Rear camera: 5 megapixels
- Display: 3.5Inch 800x480 TFT
- Sound: Stereo microphones, loudspeakers
- Data inputs: Capacitive 5-point multi-touch touchscreen
- Website: xl-viewer.com

The XL-Viewer 5000 is a senior elderly smartphone especially developed for the use by the elderly. This smartphone has a 1 GHz MediaTek Dual-Core processor, 512MB RAM, 4GB ROM, 3.5Inch IPS WVGA TFT screen, 5-points multi-touch touchscreen, Dual-SIM 2G 3G, GPS, Wi-Fi, Bluetooth 4.0, 5 Mega Pixel camera, SOS-Panic button, 2500mAh battery and runs on a Nucleus RTOS system as Android as its operating system with a user-friendly and basic XL-Viewer interface. The design of this phone is ergonomic and has an IP rating water resistant housing. The phone supports multiple-languages and shares location by GPS when the SOS button is used.

== See also ==
Rugged computers
