= XML Resource =

XRC
- Filename extension: .xrc
- Extended from: XML

XRC, or XML Resource, or XML Based Resource System is a cross-platform XML-based user interface markup language used by wxWidgets. XRC allows graphical user interface elements, such as dialogs, menu bars and toolbars, to be stored as XML, which can be loaded into the application at run-time or translated into a target programming language and compiled.

== Advantages ==
- Recompiling and linking is not always necessary when changing the interface.
- Separates the interface from the program logic.
- Ability to choose between different resource files at run time.
- XRC is a wxWidgets standard, so it can be generated and processed by any program that understands it.
- They can be written (or generated by other program) once, and used in any supported language which have wxWidgets bindings.
- XML is easier to parse than most programming languages.
- Existing XML editors can be used to edit XRC files.

== Tools ==
Specialized software tools, generally graphical user interface builder or rapid application development (RAD), allow creation of XRC files, among them are:

- wxFormBuilder
- XRCed
- wxDesigner
- DialogBlocks
- wxSmith (Code::Blocks plugin)

== See also ==
- wxWidgets
- wxGlade - an open source GUI designer that understands and generates XRC
- List of user interface markup languages
- XUL
- QML
