= Binary Application Markup Language =

Binary Application Markup Language (BAML)
- Filename extension: .baml
- Developed by: Microsoft
- Type of format: User interface markup language
- Extended from: XAML

The Binary Application Markup Language is a file format developed by Microsoft that is generated by compiling XAML files.

== Generation ==
An XAML file can be compiled into a Binary Application Markup Language file with the .BAML extension, which may be inserted as a resource into a .NET Framework assembly. At run-time, the framework engine extracts the .BAML file from assembly resources, parses it, and creates a corresponding WPF visual tree or workflow. Having this format, the content is loadable faster during runtime, because the XAML is enriched by tokens, and lexical analysis is completed.
