= OpenLaszlo =

Discontinued open-source platform

- OpenLaszlo 3.2 application and DHTML (GeaBios)
- Developer: Laszlo Systems
- Final release: 4.9.0 / October 21, 2010; 15 years ago
- Operating system: Windows XP, Windows 7, Mac OS X Jaguar or later, Linux
- Type: Web application framework
- License: Common Public License
- Website: www.openlaszlo.org

OpenLaszlo is a discontinued open-source platform for the development and delivery of rich web applications. It is released under the Open Source Initiative certified Common Public License (CPL).

The OpenLaszlo platform consists of the LZX programming language and the OpenLaszlo Server.

LZX is an Extensible Markup Language (XML) and JavaScript description language similar in spirit to XUL, MXML, and Extensible Application Markup Language (XAML). LZX enables a declarative, text-based development process that supports rapid prototyping and software development best practices. It is designed to be familiar to traditional web application developers who are familiar with HTML and JavaScript.

OpenLaszlo Server is a Java servlet that compiles LZX applications into executable binaries for targeted run-time environments.

== Deployment ==
Laszlo applications can be deployed as traditional Java servlets, which are compiled and returned to the browser dynamically. This method requires that the web server is also running the OpenLaszlo server.

Alternatively, Laszlo applications can be compiled from LZX into Dynamic HTML (DHTML) or a binary SWF file, and loaded statically into an existing web page. This method is known as SOLO deployment. Applications deployed in this manner lack some functionality of servlet-contained files, such as the ability to consume SOAP web services and Java RPC remote procedure calls.

== Licensing ==
OpenLaszlo is released under the Common Public License by Laszlo Systems.

== Adopters ==
Laszlo-powered rich web applications have been deployed by Earthlink, Verizon, Walmart, IBM WebSphere, Yahoo!, Behr, Pandora, La Quinta Hotels, DeanForAmerica.com and Time.gov.

Laszlo Systems, makers of OpenLaszlo, is developing their own software based on the Laszlo Presentation Server. One is a mail client (Laszlo Mail) which is similar to Microsoft Outlook or Mozilla Thunderbird, but which operates within the web browser. Another, called Webtop, is an integrated application environment for enterprise use.

== Version history ==
- OpenLaszlo 3.x – supports Flash Player, versions 6, 7, 8
- OpenLaszlo 4.x – supports Flash Player, versions 7, 8, 9, 10, and DHTML

== Project history ==
Laszlo was founded by David Temkin.

OpenLaszlo was originally called the Laszlo Presentation Server (LPS). Development began in the fall of 2001. Preview versions were released to select partners throughout 2002. Several of these were used for the first deployed Laszlo application, for Behr paint. The first general release of LPS was in early 2002.

In October 2004, Laszlo Systems released the full source code to the Laszlo Presentation Server under the GNU General Public License (GPL), and initiated the OpenLaszlo project. In 2005, coincident with the release of version 3.0, the name of the Laszlo Presentation Server was changed to OpenLaszlo.

Timeline

- 2000: Prototyping begins
- 2001: Development begins
- 2002: LPS preview releases; first deployed Laszlo application (Behr)
- 2003: LPS 1.0, 1.1 released; deployed applications (Yahoo!, Earthlink)
- 2004: LPS 2.0, 2.1, 2.2 released; LPS open sourced
- 2005: OpenLaszlo 3.0, 3.1 released; name changed to OpenLaszlo
- 2006: OpenLaszlo 3.2, 3.3 released
- 2007: OpenLaszlo 4.0 released
- 2008: OpenLaszlo 4.1 released
- 2008: OpenLaszlo 4.2 released
- 2009 February: OpenLaszlo 4.2.0.1 released
- 2010 October: OpenLaszlo 4.9.0. released
- 2012 February: OpenLaszlo is acquired by Critical Path, Inc.
- 2013 December: Critical Path, Inc. is acquired by Openwave Messaging

== Naming ==
The name Laszlo is of Hungarian origin. The project was named after the cat of Peter Andrea, a graphic designer and co-founder of Laszlo Systems. The cat, in turn, was named in honor of the Hungarian constructivist painter and photographer László Moholy-Nagy.

== See also ==
- List of user interface markup languages
- Comparison of user interface markup languages
- List of rich web application frameworks
