= User interface markup language =

Language that describes user interfaces

A user interface markup language is a markup language that renders and describes graphical user interfaces and controls. Many of these markup languages are dialects of XML and are dependent upon a pre-existing scripting language engine, usually a JavaScript engine, for rendering of controls and extra scriptability.

The concept of the user interface markup languages is primarily based upon the desire to prevent the "re-invention of the wheel" in the design, development and function of a user interface; such re-invention comes in the form of coding a script for the entire user interface. The typical user interface markup language solidifies often re-used program or script code in the form of markup, making it easier to focus upon design of a user interface in an understandable dialect as opposed to focus on function.

User interface markup languages, like most markup and programming languages, rely upon sub-application runtimes to interpret and render the markup code as program code that can be processed and put out in the desired form. In XML-based user interface markup languages, the markup is usually interpreted and represented as a tree of nodes that may be manipulated at runtime by the application's code or dynamically loaded user script.

== User interface markup languages ==
=== HTML ===
HTML which stands for HyperText Markup Language is a markup language used for building web pages to be displayed in a web browser. It is often combined with CSS (for styling) and JavaScript (for interactivity). Most websites in the world are built using HTML as it is the standard language supported by web browsers.

=== XFD ===
XFD, which stands for XML Form Definition is the user interface markup language behind STARLIMS product (), developed by Abbott Informatics. STARLIMS product has an entire ecosystem of runtime and design time tools to run and create visual forms using XFD language. STARLIMS v10 is powered by an XFD runtime developed using Microsoft .NET Framework and hosted in Internet Explorer browser. STARLIMS v11 introduces an additional XFD engine based on a server-side transformation engine that transforms the XFD into HTML5 compatible data designed to run on any HTML5 compliant browser. XFD is programmable in JavaScript based language.

=== QML ===
QML is a cross-platform markup language for creating hardware-accelerated OpenGL-powered user interfaces for devices ranging from mobile to desktop. QML interfaces are manipulated using the JavaScript language. QML is part of the Qt software framework.

=== MXML ===
MXML is the XML-based user interface markup language introduced by Macromedia in March 2004. It is now part of the open-source (http://opensource.adobe.com) Adobe Flex SDK version 4. MXML files compile into Flash SWF via the Flex SDK, and are rendered either on the web browser, via Adobe Flash plug-in, or as stand-alone cross-platform applications, via the open-source Adobe AIR SDK.

=== UIML ===
OASIS UIML is an XML-based standard user interface markup languages. It is an open standard where implementation is not restricted to a single vendor.

=== XUL ===
The primary interface language of Mozilla Foundation products is XUL. XUL documents are rendered by the Gecko engine, which also renders XHTML and SVG documents. It cooperates with many existing standards and technologies, including CSS, JavaScript, DTD and RDF.

=== UsiXML ===
UsiXML (which stands for User Interface Extensible Markup Language) is an XML-compliant markup language that describes the UI for multiple contexts of use such as Character User Interfaces (CUIs), graphical user interfaces (GUIs), Auditory User Interfaces, and Multimodal User Interfaces.

In other words, interactive applications with different types of interaction techniques, modalities of use, and computing platforms can be described in a way that preserves the design independently from peculiar characteristics of physical computing platform.

=== WTKX ===
WTKX is an XML-based markup language used for building Apache Pivot applications. Though it is most commonly used for defining the structure of an application's user interface, it can be used to declaratively construct any type of Java object hierarchy.

=== SVG ===
Scalable Vector Graphics is a markup language for graphics proposed by the W3C that can support rich graphics for web and mobile applications. While SVG is not a user interface language, it includes support for vector/raster graphics, animation, interaction with the DOM and CSS, embedded media, events and scriptability. When these features are used in combination, rich user interfaces are possible.

SVG can also be superimposed upon another XML-compatible user interface markup language, such as XUL and XForms, as the graphics-rich portion of a user interface.

=== XAML ===
XAML is a markup system that underlies user interface components of Microsoft's .NET Framework 3.0 and above. Its scope is more ambitious than that of most user interface markup languages, since program logic and styles are also embedded in the XAML document. Functionally, it can be seen as a combination of XUL, SVG, CSS, and JavaScript into a single XML schema.

Some people are critical of this design, as many standards (such as those already listed) exist for doing these things. However, it is expected to be developed with a visual tool where developers do not even need to understand the underlying markups.

=== I3ML ===
I3ML is a proprietary thin client Application Delivery mechanism developed by CoKinetic Systems Corp, with client support provided by a browser plugin that will render windows-like applications over an HTTP infrastructure with minimal bandwidth needs.

=== OpenLaszlo (LZX) ===
OpenLaszlo is a runtime environment that comprises a runtime environment and an interface definition language (Laszlo XML - LZX). LZX is a declarative user interface language which defines the widgets, application layout and scripting elements (using JavaScript) to create your application. LZX is runtime agnostic with the currently supported runtime being within Macromedia/Adobe Flash. An experimental runtime called Laszlo "Legals" that will allow OpenLaszlo (LZX) applications run in multiple runtime environments, such as DHTML/AJAX.

=== HMVCUL ===
Hierarchical Model View Controller User Interface Language (HMVCUL) is an XML markup user interface language which supports the creation and chaining of atomic MVC triad components used in constructing HMVC GUI applications. The associated runtime provides methods which enable configuration of properties, data binding and events of each of the MVC triad elements (widget, controller, model). The runtime accomplishes this by mapping XML elements defined in an HMVCUL file to objects inside the framework, attributes to properties or to events. Chaining is accomplished by following the tree structure described inside the HMVCUL file.

=== MARIA ===
MARIA is a universal, declarative, multiple abstraction level, XML-based language for modelling interactive applications in ubiquitous environments.

=== FXML ===
FXML is a XML-based language for defining the user interface of JavaFX applications.

=== Other ===
Other markup languages incorporated into existing frameworks are:

- VTML for Macromedia HomeSite

Apple's Interface Builder .xib format

Some of these are compiled into binary forms.

In avionics, the ARINC 661 standard prescribes a binary format to define user interfaces in glass cockpits.

Borland VCL forms (.dfm and .lfm) are text files describing the windows of Delphi and Lazarus applications. They are compiled into the final executable in binary format, and use RTTI to function.

== See also ==
- User Interface Modeling
- Layout engine
- Widget toolkit
- List of user interface markup languages
- Comparison of user interface markup languages
- Interface description language
