= Sun Java Studio Creator =

Java development tool

Sun Java Studio Creator was a commercial integrated development environment based on NetBeans developed by Sun Microsystems. It was discontinued in 2007.
