= VTML =

User interface markup language

Visual Tool Markup Language (VTML) is a user interface markup language used by Macromedia HomeSite, ColdFusion Studio and JRun Studio. VTML is used for tag editors and custom dialogs shipped with these applications and can be used to extend the user interface and to support additional tag-based languages.

VTML is documented in help files included with these applications or available online, notably in the "VTML Reference" and "Customizing the Development Environment" sections.

Wizard Markup Language (WIZML) is a sub-language of VTML that defines the logic used by user interface wizards and tag editors.
