= JavaOne =

Former annual developer conference

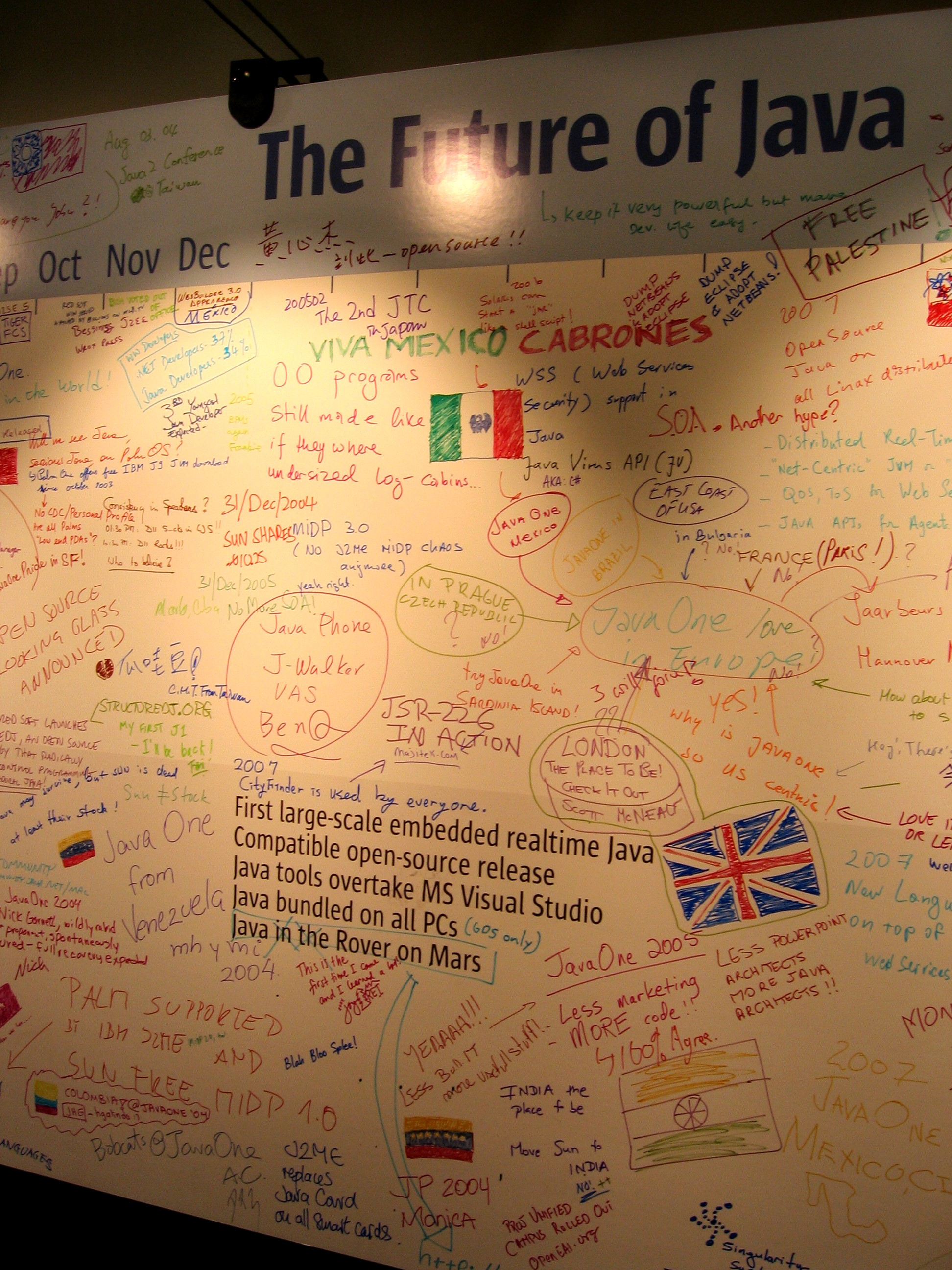
Attendees at the 2004 JavaOne conference described their vision of the future of Java on a whiteboard.

JavaOne is an annual conference first organized in 1996 by Sun Microsystems to discuss Java technologies, primarily among Java developers. It was held in San Francisco, California, typically running from a Monday to Thursday in summer months (early on) or in early fall months (later). Technical sessions and Birds of a Feather (BOF) sessions on a variety of Java-related topics were held throughout the week.

The show was very popular; for the 1999 edition, there were 20,000 attendees at the Moscone Center.

For many years, the conference was hosted by Sun executive and Java evangelist John Gage.

In 1999, the conference played host to an event called the Hackathon, a challenge set by Gage. Attendees were to write a program in Java for the new Palm V using the infrared port to communicate with other Palm users and register the device on the Internet.

During the 2008 conference, seventy Moscone Center staff members and three attendees were sickened by an outbreak of norovirus.

After the acquisition of Sun by Oracle Corporation in 2010, the conference was held concurrently with Oracle OpenWorld. The conference was moved from Moscone Center to hotels on nearby Mason Street. In some years, one block of Mason was closed and covered with a tent, which formed part of the conference venue.

In April 2018, Oracle announced that the JavaOne conference would be discontinued, in favor of a more general programming conference called Oracle Code One. The CodeOne conference ran for two years.

In March 2022, Oracle announced that JavaOne would return in October 2022, reclaiming the position the now defunct CodeOne conference once occupied. The conference has moved to Las Vegas from its original location in San Francisco.

As announced by Oracle in March 2024, JavaOne was held in March 2025, coinciding with Java's 30th birthday, and the release of Java 24, at Oracle Headquarters in Redwood Shores, CA, moving back to (near) its original location in San Francisco.

== Show device ==
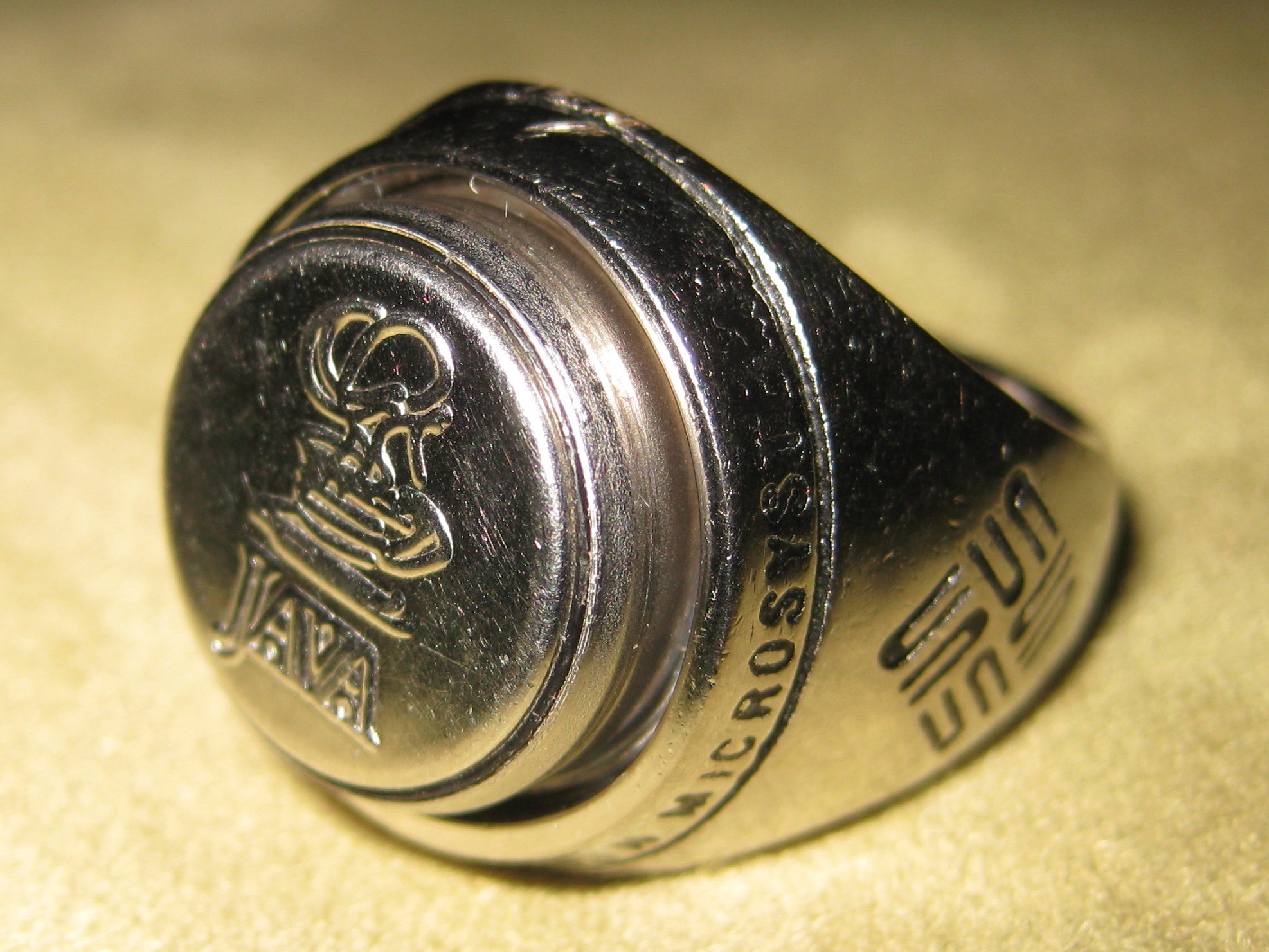
Ring with embedded Java-programmable microprocessor, available at JavaOne 1998

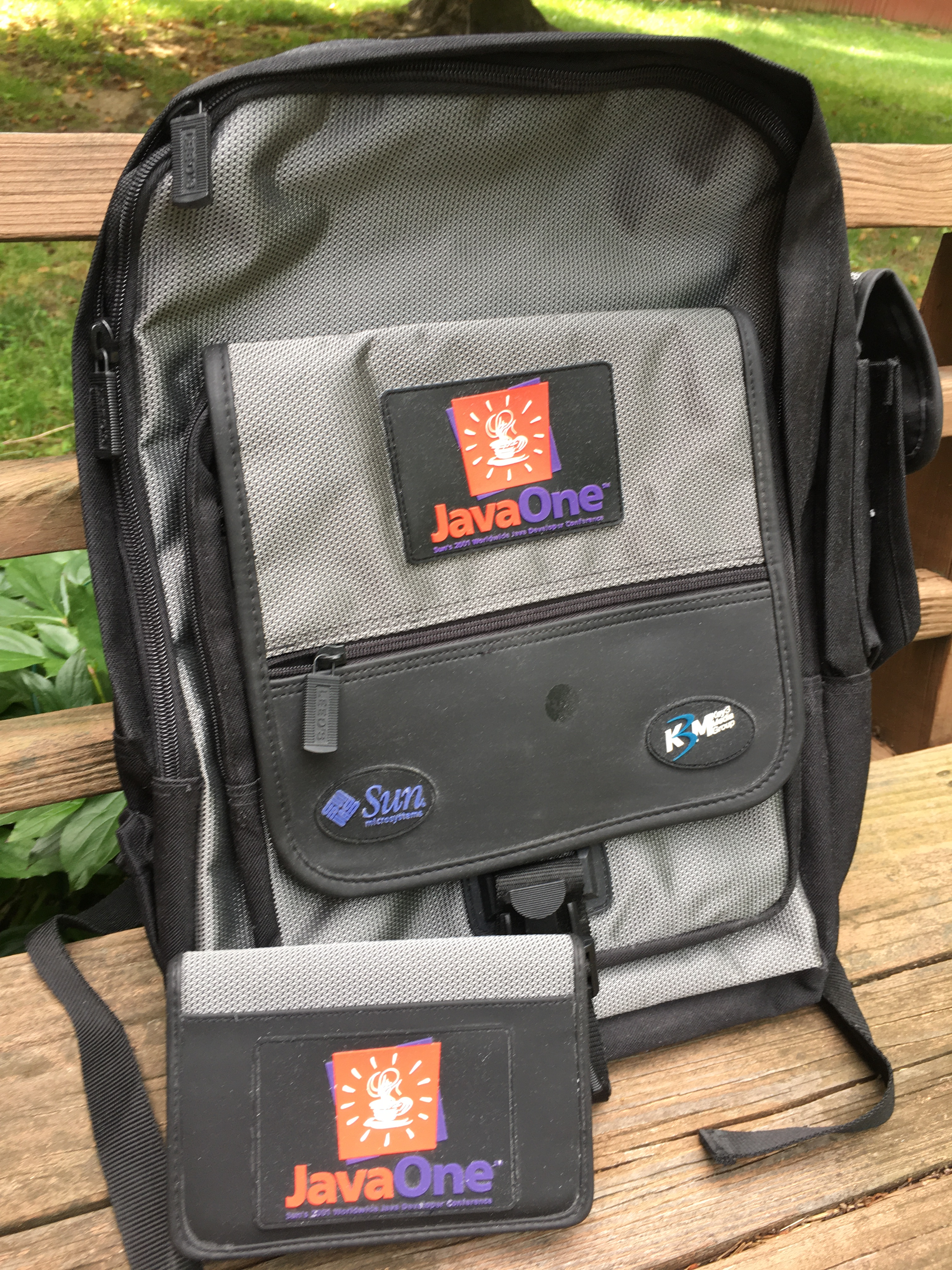
JavaOne-branded backpack and case, given out at JavaOne 2001

Several of the conferences highlighted a hardware device, typically made available to attendees before it is sold to the general public, or at a steep discount:

- 1998: Java ring
- 1999: Palm V
- 2002: Sharp Zaurus
- 2004: Homepod, a wireless MP3 device from Gloolabs
- 2006: SavaJe Jasper S20 phone
- 2007: RS Media programmable robot
- 2008: Sentilla Perk Kit, Pulse Smartpen, Sony Ericsson K850i
- 2009: HTC Diamond with JavaFX pre-installed

== CommunityOne ==
From 2007 to 2009, an associated one-day event, CommunityOne, was held, for the broader free and open-source developer community.

In 2009, CommunityOne expanded to New York City (CommunityOne East, March 18–19) and to Oslo, Norway (CommunityOne North, April 15). The third annual CommunityOne in San Francisco took place from June 1–3, 2009, at Moscone Center.

Tracks included:

- Cloud Platforms – Development and deployment in the cloud
- Social and Collaborative Platforms – Social networks and Web 2.0 trends
- RIAs and Scripting – Rich Internet Applications, scripting and tools
- Web Platforms – Dynamic languages, databases, and Web servers
- Server-side Platforms – SOA, tools, application servers, and databases
- Mobile Development – Mobile platforms, devices, tools and application development
- Operating Systems and Infrastructure – Performance, virtualization, and native development
- Free and Open – Open-source projects, business models, and trends

CommunityOne was discontinued after the acquisition of Sun by Oracle.
