= FXML =

XML-based user interface markup language intended for use with JavaFX

- Developed by: Oracle Corporation
- Initial release: October 2011
- Type of format: User interface markup language
- Extended from: XML

FXML is an XML-based user interface markup language created by Oracle Corporation for defining the user interface of a JavaFX application. FXML presents an alternative to designing user interfaces using procedural code, and allows for abstracting program design from program logic.

<?import javafx.scene.control.Label?>
<Label text="Hello, World!"/>

== See also ==
- Comparison of user interface markup languages
- List of user interface markup languages § Java
