= UsiXML =

Markup language

UsiXML (USer Interface eXtensible Markup Language) is an XML-based markup language for defining user interfaces on computers.

UsiXML is a specification language for user interface design. It allows the designer to describe a user interface at different levels of abstraction. In other words, you can specify a UI in terms of: functionality (task analysis), the object it manipulates, or in a more concrete way, user interface.

The UsiXML language is currently being submitted for a standardisation plan to the W3C.

Another work with the same purpose is UIML.

== Tool support ==
There are plenty of tools that can be found for UsiXML. They include: a translator from UsiXML specification to Flash (FlashiXML), a tool for drawing/sketching user interfaces (SketchiXML), a tool for task analysis (idealXML).
