= Windows UI Library =

Native user interface framework for Windows apps

WinUI 3
- Other names: Windows UI Library, WinUI, Microsoft.UI.Xaml; predecessors: UWP XAML, WinRT XAML, Windows.UI.Xaml
- Developer: Microsoft
- Release: March 29, 2021; 5 years ago (WinUI 3); September 2011 (WinRT XAML)
- Stable release: 2.5.1 (Windows App SDK) / September 16, 2026; 55 days ago
- Preview release: 2.5.4-experimental / September 29, 2026; 42 days ago
- Written in: C++, C#
- Operating system: Windows 10 version 1809 and later, Windows 11
- Platform: x86, x86-64, ARM64
- Type: Widget toolkit, application framework
- License: MIT License
- Website: aka.ms/windev
- Repository: github.com/microsoft/microsoft-ui-xaml

WinUI 3 (from Windows UI Library) is the native user interface framework for building desktop applications for Microsoft Windows. It is developed by Microsoft and ships as part of the Windows App SDK (formerly "Project Reunion"). Developers describe user interfaces in XAML and write application logic in C# with .NET, or in C++ using C++/WinRT. WinUI 3 implements Microsoft's Fluent Design System and provides the controls and visual styles used in Windows 11.

WinUI 3 is the successor to the XAML framework built into Windows since Windows 8, variously known as WinRT XAML or UWP XAML (codenamed "Jupiter"), and to WinUI 2, a library of controls for Universal Windows Platform (UWP) apps. Unlike its predecessors, WinUI 3 is decoupled from the operating system: it is distributed with the Windows App SDK rather than with Windows itself, so new features can be updated independently of Windows releases and run on older supported versions of Windows. It is used by parts of Windows 11 itself, including portions of File Explorer.

== Features ==
Microsoft describes WinUI 3 as the recommended UI framework for new Windows desktop applications. It provides a set of controls and styles that follow the Fluent Design System, so apps can match the look and behavior of built-in Windows 11 experiences. The framework is designed for high-DPI displays and supports touch, pen, keyboard, and mouse input.

User interfaces are written in XAML, with application code in C# (.NET) or C++, and apps run on x86, x64, and ARM devices. Because WinUI 3 is part of the Windows App SDK, apps built with it are standard desktop (Win32) applications that can use other Windows platform APIs, including windowing, notifications, and Windows AI APIs. They can be distributed as MSIX packages or without packaging. Existing Win32 applications can also adopt WinUI 3 incrementally by hosting it in their own windows through XAML Islands.

Parts of the Windows shell and its built-in apps are built with WinUI, as is the open-source Microsoft PowerToys utility suite.

== Development tools ==
WinUI 3 apps can be created and built either in Visual Studio, using its WinUI application development workload and project templates, or from the command line with the Windows App Development CLI (winapp CLI). The CLI's winapp new and winapp run commands scaffold, build, and launch a WinUI project from a terminal, so it can be used with any code editor, as well as in continuous integration pipelines and by AI coding agents. The open-source winapp CLI was in public preview as of October 2026. Visual Studio does not offer a visual designer for WinUI 3.

Microsoft publishes WinUI 3 Gallery, an open-source app that demonstrates the framework's controls and styles.

The Uno Platform implements the WinUI API on other operating systems, allowing WinUI-based apps to run on Android, iOS, macOS, Linux, and the web. .NET Multi-platform App UI (.NET MAUI) uses WinUI 3 to render its user interface on Windows.

== Open-source development ==
WinUI 2 was released under the MIT License in December 2018. For WinUI 3, Microsoft initially mirrored only part of the source code to GitHub periodically, while development took place in a private repository. In July 2025, Microsoft announced a four-phase plan to make WinUI "truly open source": more frequent mirroring, enabling third parties to build the code locally, enabling third parties to run tests and submit pull requests, and making GitHub the primary development location. In August 2026, Microsoft announced that mainline WinUI development had moved to GitHub. Pull requests were initially limited to Microsoft engineers while the contribution process was validated.

== Reception ==
WinUI 3 has been praised for providing the Windows 11 look and Fluent Design in desktop apps, but developers have criticized its performance, number of unfixed bugs, slow pace of development, and lack of a visual designer in Visual Studio. Component vendor DevExpress reported in 2022 that WinRT interop overhead limited the performance of WinUI 3 components. Commentators have also pointed to Microsoft's history of changing UI framework strategy, and inconsistent adoption of its own frameworks across the company, as a source of developer distrust.

In March 2026, Windows head Pavan Davuluri stated that Microsoft intended to "move more experiences to WinUI 3" as part of an effort to improve Windows quality and responsiveness. In May 2026, the WinUI team reported performance optimizations that reduced memory allocations in File Explorer's WinUI components by 41 percent; some of the optimizations are opt-in at first because they involve breaking changes.

== History ==
=== WinRT XAML (2011–2015) ===
The XAML framework that WinUI descends from was unveiled with the Windows 8 Developer Preview in September 2011 as part of the Windows Runtime (WinRT), for building Metro-style apps. Unlike Windows Presentation Foundation (WPF) and Silverlight, which are written in managed code and require .NET languages, WinRT XAML was written in C++ and built into the operating system, and could be used from C++ (C++/CX, later C++/WinRT) as well as C# and Visual Basic. Its API surface, under the Windows.UI.Xaml namespace, closely followed Silverlight.

Up to Windows Phone 8, phone apps used Silverlight XAML and were distributed in XAP format. Windows Phone 8.1 added WinRT XAML, enabling Universal apps that shared most of their code, including the user interface, between Windows 8.1 and Windows Phone 8.1. Windows Phone 8.1 continued to run Silverlight apps, which gained new APIs as "Silverlight 8.1". With Windows 10 in 2015, the framework became the UI layer of the Universal Windows Platform (UWP) and was commonly called UWP XAML.

=== WinUI 2 (2018) ===
In July 2018, Microsoft released a preview of the Windows UI Library, a set of NuGet packages (Microsoft.UI.Xaml) that delivered new controls and styles to UWP apps independently of the Windows SDK and back to older versions of Windows 10. Its source code was published on GitHub under the MIT License in December 2018. Retroactively named WinUI 2, the library extends rather than replaces the XAML framework built into Windows, which still performs the rendering. Later versions added the rounded-corner styles of Windows 11. WinUI 2 continues to serve as the control library for UWP apps.

=== WinUI 3 and Project Reunion (2019–2021) ===
WinUI 3 was conceived as a full decoupling of the XAML framework from Windows, moving the entire UI stack, not just controls, into a separately shipped package under the new Microsoft.UI.Xaml namespace. Microsoft released early WinUI 3 builds in 2019 and 2020, and at Build 2020 announced Project Reunion, an effort to unify the Win32 and UWP app models. The first stable WinUI 3 release shipped with Project Reunion 0.5 on March 29, 2021, followed by version 0.8 in June 2021. Project Reunion was later renamed Windows App SDK. WinUI 3 targets desktop apps; UWP apps continue to use WinUI 2.

=== Windows App SDK releases (2021–present) ===
Windows App SDK, and with it WinUI 3, is released through three channels: Stable, for production apps; Preview; and Experimental, for features under development.

Windows App SDK stable releases
Version	Release date	Notes
0.5	March 29, 2021	First stable WinUI 3 release (Project Reunion)
0.8	June 24, 2021	
1.0	November 16, 2021	First release under the Windows App SDK name
1.1	May 24, 2022	
1.2	November 10, 2022	
1.3	April 12, 2023	
1.4	August 29, 2023	XAML Islands no longer experimental
1.5	February 29, 2024	
1.6	September 4, 2024	
1.7	March 18, 2025	
1.8	September 9, 2025	
2.0	April 29, 2026	First release using Semantic Versioning

Windows App SDK 2.0, released on April 29, 2026, was the first major version change since 1.0 and the first release to use Semantic Versioning, with the SDK version aligned to its NuGet package version. Under the new scheme, breaking changes are reserved for major versions. Minor versions 2.1 through 2.5 followed between May and September 2026.

== See also ==
- Windows App SDK
- Windows Presentation Foundation
- Universal Windows Platform
- .NET Multi-platform App UI (.NET MAUI)
- Uno Platform
- OpenSilver
- Fluent Design System
