= WinJS =

Open-source JavaScript library

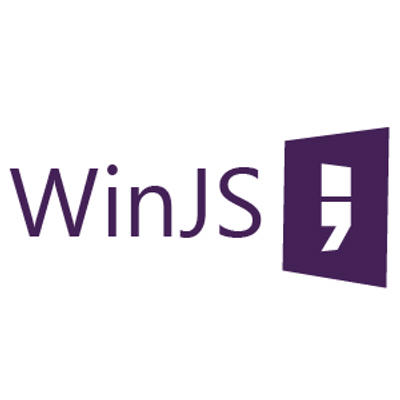
- Developer: Microsoft
- Initial release: October 26, 2012; 13 years ago
- Stable release: 4.4.5 / January 25, 2019; 7 years ago
- Written in: JavaScript, TypeScript
- Operating system: Windows 8, Windows 10, Windows Phone 8.1, Windows 10 Mobile, Xbox One system software
- Type: Software framework
- License: Apache License 2.0
- Website: www.buildwinjs.com
- Repository: github.com/winjs/winjs

The Windows Library for JavaScript (abbreviated as WinJS) is an open-source JavaScript library developed by Microsoft. It has been designed with the primary goal of easing development of Windows Store apps for Windows 8 and Windows 10, as well as Windows Phone apps for Windows Phone 8.1, Windows 10 Mobile and Xbox One applications using HTML5 and JavaScript, as an alternative to using WinRT XAML and C#, VB.NET or C++ (CX).

WinJS started as a technology that was specific to Windows Store apps, but has evolved to aim at working in any Web browser. In April 2014, during the Microsoft Build developer conference, WinJS was released under the Apache License as free and open source software to port it to other than Microsoft platforms. A site dedicated to demonstrating the library has also been published.

Future development on WinJS is focused on maintaining what currently exists in the project. There are no plans for new features or feature requests, meaning no plans for a new feature release. The WinJS repository hasn't had a new commit since 2020.

== Overview ==
WinJS provides helpers that facilitate the development of Windows Store apps using HTML5 and JavaScript. The library consists of modules and functions that expose the Windows Runtime in a way that is consistent with JavaScript coding conventions. WinJS makes it possible to add Windows UI controls in HTML. This is accompanied by support for data binding and a template engine.

Other JavaScript frameworks, such as JQuery, can work side-by-side with WinJS. The library comes with additional declaration files for a rich developer experience using TypeScript, a strict superset of JavaScript with annotations. TypeScript enables for code completion and refactoring while maintaining compatibility with JavaScript.

== Features ==
- UI controls with fundamental support for touch, mouse and keyboard.
- Scaffolding.

== Version history ==
=== WinJS 1.0 ===
The first version of WinJS. It was released with Windows 8.

=== WinJS 2.0 ===
WinJS was released as open-source software under the Apache License on GitHub by popular demand. The project aimed at cross-platform and browser compatibility. The following distributions are derived from WinJS 2.0:

- WinJS 2.0 for Windows 8.1
- WinJS Xbox 1.0 for Windows
- WinJS Phone 2.1 for Windows Phone 8.1

=== WinJS 3.0 ===
WinJS 3.0 was released in September, 2014 with special focus on:

- Cross-browser/cross-platform support spanning the most popular desktop and mobile browsers, as well as HTML-based app environments like Apache Cordova
- JavaScript modularization giving developers the control to optimize their performance and load just the modules of the WinJS library they need for their Web site or app
- Improved universal control designs

=== WinJS 4.0 ===
A preview of WinJS 4.0 was announced on March 27, 2015, and the full release was announced on June 8.

== See also ==
- HTML5
- JavaScript
- JScript
- React Native, alternative JavaScript library for UWP application development
- Windows 8
- Windows Runtime
- JavaScript library
- Web framework
