= App Installer =

Software component of Windows 10

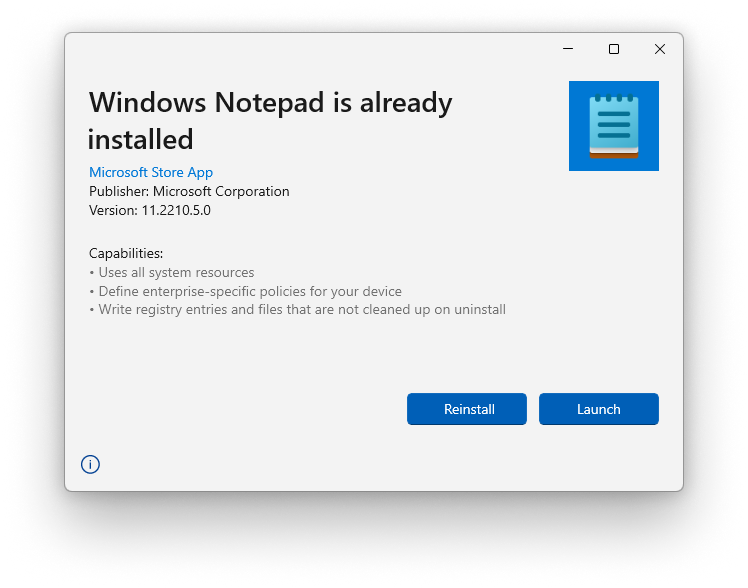
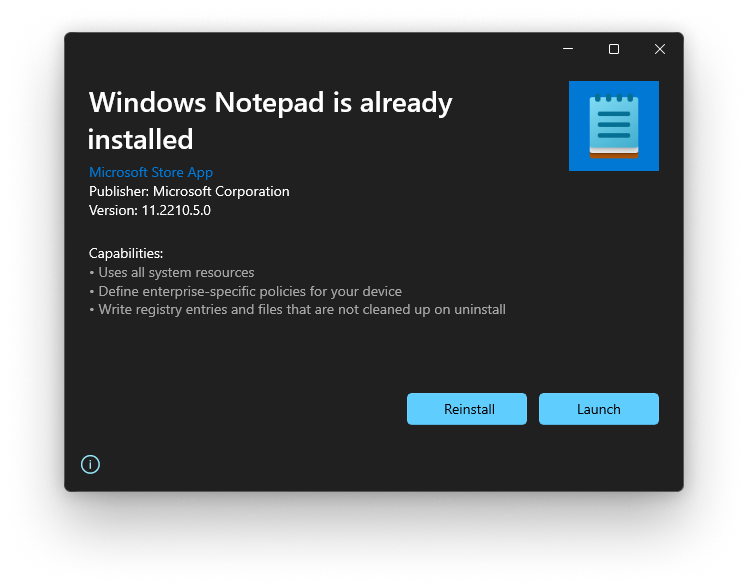
- App Installer running on Windows 11
- Developer: Microsoft
- Release: 2016; 10 years ago
- Stable release: 1.29.380 / September 21, 2026; 59 days ago
- Operating system: Windows 10, 11
- Type: Installer

App Installer is a software component of Windows 10, introduced in the 2016 Anniversary Update, used for the installation and maintenance of applications packaged in .appx or .appxbundle installation packages; they are loosely relational databases with an XML app manifest. The .appx and .appxbundle files contain either a Win32 or a Universal Windows Platform app, icons for the Start menu and taskbar, a virtualized version of any Windows Registry keys needed, and any other assets needed for the installed app to function.

== Alternatives ==
The only other Windows components capable of installing APPX packages are Microsoft Store and Windows PowerShell. However, the latter requires Developer Mode to be turned on. App Installer provides a more user-friendly interface that is opened by clicking on the installation package.

== Design ==
The design for App Installer is similar to the one for the classic Windows Installer, which installs stand-alone MSI files. It shows the app name, the developer, the Start menu tile, and a set of capabilities enabled by the app manifest. If the user clicks the Install button at the bottom right corner, the App Installer checks the app's digital certificate. Unlike a standalone installer, App Installer refuses to install an app without a valid digital certificate. If the certificate is valid, the app displays a blue installation progress bar. It shows the user a button to launch the app once it is fully installed.

== Customisability ==
App Installer is physically more flexible than Windows Installer. It can be resized and viewed in full-screen mode and the background changes based on the system-wide light or dark mode. Apps installed with App Installer can be updated through the Windows Store. It is also possible to update an app with an App Installer by opening the package with a higher version number than the one installed. Since APPX installations are sandboxed, unlike traditional software, running multiple installations at once is possible.

== Installation ==
MSIX packages are designed to have a stable installation progress. Along with the ability to uninstall, MSIX packages share files across the system to save space. The packages are currently supported for installations and updates across Windows Desktop, Server, and Enterprise. These packages can be entirely self-contained or fetch files from a remote location to complete the install. All distributed apps are required to be signed by a key from a trusted Certificate Authority.
