= Windows App Studio =

Web app

- Developer: Microsoft
- Operating system: OS-independent (Web app)
- Platform: Windows 10, Windows 8.1, Windows Phone 8.1
- Available in: English, German, Spanish, French, Italian, Portuguese, Russian, Japanese, Korean, Simplified Chinese, Traditional Chinese
- Type: Integrated development environment
- Website: appstudio.windows.com Archived 2017-11-22 at the Wayback Machine

Windows App Studio, formerly Windows Phone App Studio is a discontinued web app provided by Microsoft for Windows app development. It allowed users to create apps that could be installed or published to the Microsoft Store (Formerly known as the Windows Store), and in addition provided the full source code in the form of a Visual Studio 'solution'. The tool was used to develop Universal Windows Platform apps.

== Features ==
It allowed newcomers to computer programming to create software applications for the Windows and Windows Phone operating system (OS). It used a graphical interface, allowing users to create an application that could run on Windows Phone and Windows devices with little experience, and concentrated primarily on apps for websites and content streams.

It also allowed users to download the source code of the applications made within the studio for further edits in Visual Studio. Some of its features included a Logo and Image Wizard, customizable theme templates, and the ability to insert embedded content from sites such as YouTube, Flickr and Facebook. The service worked only for those with a Microsoft account and was provided completely free of charge.

== History ==
On 27 May 2015, Microsoft added support for Windows 10 applications and included new features such as live tile updatability, Xbox Music Data Sourcing, Bing Maps, and analytics for applications concerning how often an application gets opened, crashes, and is used by users who have installed it.

In March 2016, Microsoft released the Windows App Studio Installer for Windows 10 and Windows 10 Mobile devices which allowed developers to install and test applications developed in the Windows App Studio, and generate and scan QR codes associated with the download link of their application.

In June 2017, Microsoft announced that they would be shutting down the service on 1 December in the same year. However, Windows Template Studio is available as the successor to the Windows App Studio in the form of a Visual Studio extension to create apps. The source code of the succeeding project is provided at GitHub.

== See also ==
- MIT App Inventor
- Microsoft DVLUP
