= Uno Platform =

Open source cross-platform graphical user interface

- Original author: nventive
- Developers: Uno Platform and community
- Release: May 7, 2018; 8 years ago
- Stable release: 6.6.184 / August 6, 2026; 2 months ago
- Written in: C#, XAML, .NET, .NET Framework, TypeScript, Xamarin, Universal Windows Platform, WinUI, WebAssembly
- Platform: Web platform Mobile Device
- Type: .NET Library and Framework
- License: Apache License
- Website: platform.uno
- Repository: github.com/unoplatform/uno

Uno Platform (/ˈuˌnoʊ/) is an open source cross-platform graphical user interface that allows WinUI and XAML - based code to run on iOS, macOS, Linux, Android, Windows and WebAssembly. Uno Platform is released under the Apache 2.0 license.

Applications can be built by using the tools in Visual Studio on Windows, including XAML and C#, and run on iOS, macOS, Android, Windows or in WebAssembly in a web browser. A plug in for Microsoft Visual Studio is available from Microsoft's Visual Studio Marketplace, VS Code Marketplace, or JetBrains Rider Marketplace. In addition to traditional IDEs, Uno Platform also offers an MCP server compatible with CLI environments and AI agents such as GitHub Copilot CLI, OpenAI Codex, Google Antigravity, and Cursor. The community surrounding Uno Platform open source project comes together at its annual conference UnoConf.

Uno Platform is an open-source project sustained by a support model like Red Hat’s and via revenue from its commercial product, Uno Platform Studio, for which it raised a seed round. Microsoft and Uno Platform announced official collaboration on maintaining .NET for iOS and .NET for Android GitHub repositories, as well as co-maintenance of SkiaSharp repository. Microsoft lists Uno Platform as one of the alternatives to its own development stack.

== See also ==
- WebAssembly
- Blazor
- .NET Multi-platform App UI (.NET MAUI)
- Windows App SDK
- OpenSilver
- List of open-source application frameworks
