= XAML Browser Applications =

File format

XBAP
- Filename extension: .xbap
- Internet media type: application/x-ms-xbap
- Type of format: Package management system, file archive
- Container for: Software package
- Extended from: ZIP

XAML Browser Applications (XBAP, pronounced "ex-bap") are Windows Presentation Foundation (.xbap) applications that were intended to run inside a web browser such as Firefox or Internet Explorer through the NPAPI interface. Due to NPAPI being phased out in recent years, and due to a lack of support, there are currently no browsers that support XBAP applications.

Hosted applications run in a partial trust sandbox environment and are not given full access to the computer's resources like opening a new network connection or saving a file to the computer disk and not all WPF functionality is available. The hosted environment is intended to protect the computer from malicious applications; however it can also run in full trust mode by the client changing the permission. Starting an XBAP from an HTML page was seamless (with no security or installation prompt). Although one perceived the application running in the browser, it actually ran in an out-of-process executable (PresentationHost.exe) managed by a virtual machine.

== XBAP limitations ==
XBAP applications have certain restrictions on what .NET features they can use. Since they run in partial trust, they are restricted to the same set of permissions granted to any InternetZone application. Nearly all standard WPF functionality, however, around 99%, is available to an XBAP application. Therefore, most of the WPF UI features are available.

Starting in February 2009, XBAP applications no longer function when run from the Internet. Attempting to run the XBAP will cause the browser to present a generic error message. An option exists in Internet Explorer 9 that can be used to allow the applications to run, but this must be done with care as it increases the potential attack surface - and there have been security vulnerabilities in XBAP.

=== Permitted ===
- 2D drawing
- 3D
- Animation
- Audio

=== Not permitted ===
- Access to OS drag-and-drop
- Bitmap effects (these are deprecated in .NET 3.5 SP1)
- Direct database communication (unless the application is fully trusted)
- Interoperability with Windows controls or ActiveX controls
- Most standard dialogs
- Shader effects
- Stand-alone Windows

== See also ==
- ClickOnce
- Extensible Application Markup Language (XAML)
- Google Native Client (NaCl)
- HTML Application (HTA)
- Microsoft Silverlight
- WebAssembly
- Windows UI Library (WinUI or WinRT XAML)
- XAP (file format)
- Java Web Start
