= Windows App SDK =

Software development kit from Microsoft

- Other names: Project Reunion
- Developer: Microsoft
- Release: 29 March 2021
- Stable release: 1.6.1 / 1 October 2024
- Preview release: 1.6.0-preview2 / 23 August 2024
- Written in: C++
- Operating system: Windows 10 version 1809 and later Windows Server 2019 and later
- Platform: x86-64, ARM64, IA-32
- Type: Software framework
- License: MIT License
- Website: learn.microsoft.com/windows/apps/windows-app-sdk/
- Repository: github.com/microsoft/WindowsAppSDK

Windows App SDK (codenamed Project Reunion) is a "framework package" from Microsoft that provides a unified application programming interface (API) and components that can be used to develop desktop apps for Windows 10 version 1809, Windows Server 2019, and their successors. Its purpose is to decouple capabilities that were previously tied to the UWP app model, allowing Win32 or .NET apps to take advantage of them as well. It intends to complement, not replace, the Windows SDK. It exposes a common API primarily using Windows Runtime, eliminating the tradeoffs which once characterized either app model.

NuGet packages for version 1.4 were released in August 2023 after approximately four months of development.

== Features and components ==
While Microsoft has developed a number of new features, some of the features listed below are abstractions of functionality provided by existing APIs.

=== WinUI 3 ===
Most of the investment into the decoupled UI stack has gone towards bug fixes, improvements to the debugging experience, and simplifying the window management capabilities made possible by switching from CoreWindow. An API abstracting USER32/GDI32 primitives known as AppWindow was introduced to expose a unified set of windowing capabilities and enable support for custom window controls.

=== WebView2 ===
A replacement for the UWP WebView control was announced early on. This is because it was based on an unsupported browser engine. A new Chromium-based control, named WebView2, was developed and can be used from WinUI as well as other supported app types.

=== Packaging ===
While MSIX is included in the Windows App SDK and considered to be the recommended application packaging format, a design goal was to allow for unpackaged apps. These apps can be deployed as self-contained or framework-dependent. Support for dynamic loading of app dependencies is included for both packaged and unpackaged apps.

=== Graphics ===
DWriteCore is being developed as a decoupled and device-independent solution for high-quality text rendering. Win2D has also been made available to WinUI 3 apps.

=== Resource management ===
MRT Core allows for management of app resources for purposes such as localization. It is a decoupled version of the resource management system from UWP.

=== App lifecycle ===
With the stable releases delivered after its initial launch, Windows App SDK now supports several app lifecycle features which previously required a considerable amount of effort for developers to implement in Win32 applications. These features include power management notifications, rich activation, multiple instances, and programmatic app restart.

=== Notifications ===
Support for push notifications was initially implemented as a limited-access, preview feature. However, the APIs for it have since been stabilized and push notifications can be delivered to app users. Official documentation states that access to the feature can be revoked by Microsoft at their discretion. Additionally, apps can now easily display local app notifications without the need to create an XML payload.

=== Widgets ===
Third-party integration with the Windows Widgets system in Windows 11 has been included as part of the stable release channel. Developers can design custom widgets for their app using adaptive cards and surface them on the widgets board.

== See also ==
- DWriteCore & Win2D
- Uno Platform
- Windows Driver Kit (WDK)
