= MIT App Inventor =

Web application development environment

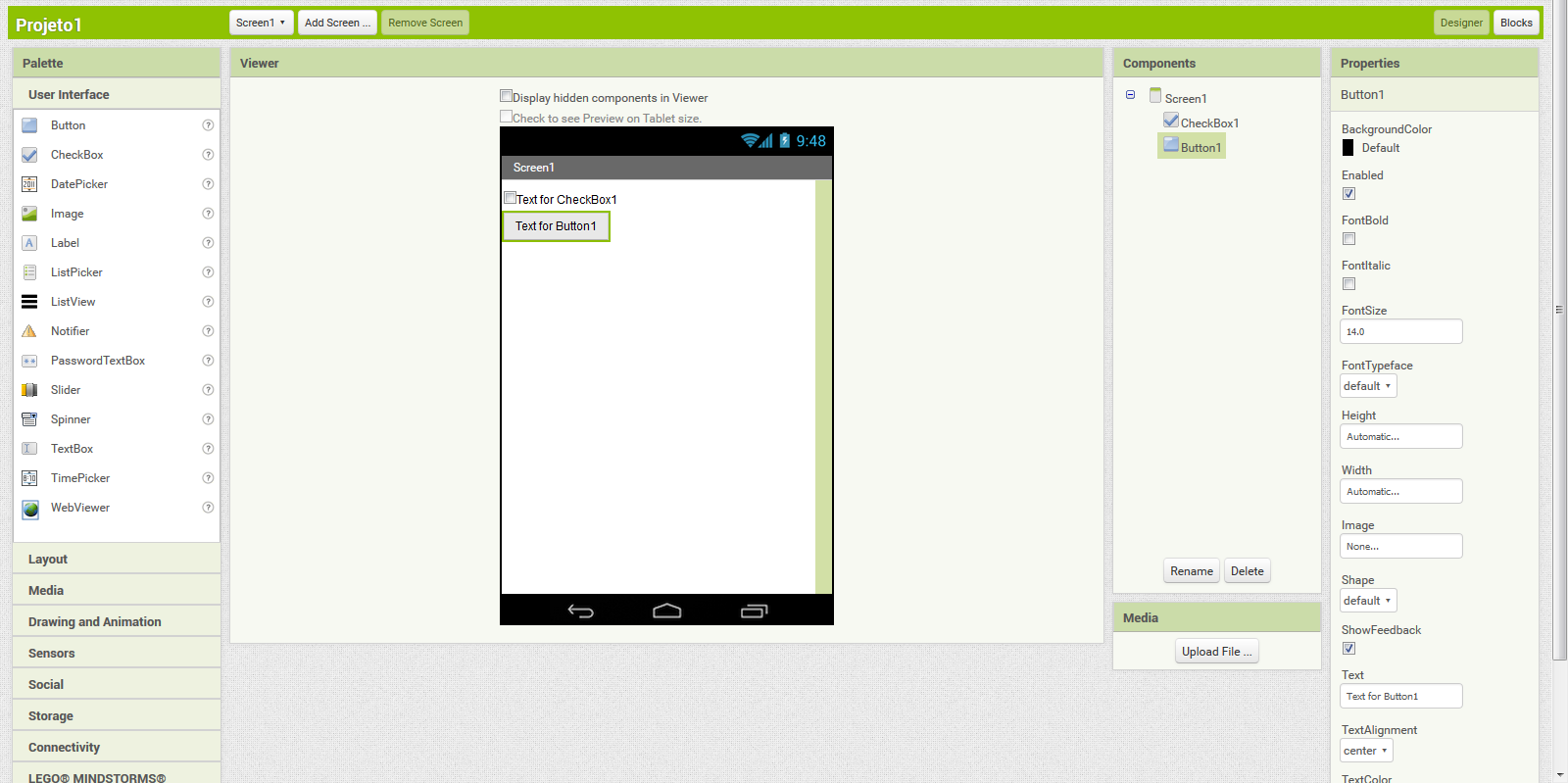
- MIT App Inventor
- Original authors: Hal Abelson, Mark Friedman
- Developers: Google, MIT Media Lab, MIT Computer Science and Artificial Intelligence Laboratory
- Release: December 15, 2010; 15 years ago
- Stable release: nb207 / October 28, 2026; 1 day ago
- Written in: Java, Swift, Objective-C, Kawa, Scheme, JavaScript, HTML
- Operating system: Android, iOS
- Available in: 19 languages
- List of languages English, Spanish, French, Italian, Korean, Dutch, Portuguese, Brazilian Portuguese, Russian, Swedish, Simplified Chinese, Traditional Chinese, Polish
- Type: Application software development IDE
- License: Creative Commons Attribution ShareAlike 4.0 Unported, Apache 2.0
- Website: appinventor.mit.edu
- Repository: github.com/mit-cml/appinventor-sources

MIT App Inventor (App Inventor or MIT AI2) is a high-level block-based visual programming language, originally built by Google and now maintained by the Massachusetts Institute of Technology (MIT). It allows newcomers to create computer applications for two operating systems: Android and iOS, which, as of 25 September 2023, was in beta testing. It is free and open-source released under dual licensing: a Creative Commons Attribution ShareAlike 3.0 Unported license and an Apache License 2.0 for the source code. Its target is primarily children and students studying computer programming, similar to Scratch.

The web interface consists of a graphical user interface (GUI) very similar to Scratch and StarLogo, allowing users to drag-and-drop visual objects (blocks) to create an application that can be tested on Android and iOS devices and compiled to run as an Android app. It uses a companion mobile app named MIT AI2 Companion providing live testing and debugging.

App Inventor provides integration with different online services, such as Google Sheets and Firebase.

When creating App Inventor, Google drew upon significant prior research in educational computing, and work done within Google on online development environments.

== History ==
The application was made available through request on July 12, 2010, and released publicly on December 15, 2010. The App Inventor team was led by Hal Abelson and Mark Friedman. In the second half of 2011, Google released the source code, terminated its server, and provided funding to create The MIT Center for Mobile Learning, led by App Inventor creator Hal Abelson and fellow MIT professors Eric Klopfer and Mitchel Resnick. The MIT version was launched in March 2012.

On December 6, 2013 (the start of the Hour of Code), MIT released App Inventor 2, renaming the original version "App Inventor Classic" Major differences are:

- The blocks editor in the original version ran in a separate Java process, using the Open Blocks Java library for creating visual blocks programming languages and programming

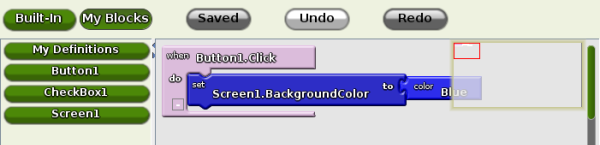
App Inventor Classic Blocks Editor

Open Blocks is distributed by MIT's Scheller Teacher Education Program (STEP) and is derived from master's thesis research by Ricarose Roque. Professor Eric Klopfer and Daniel Wendel of the Scheller Program supported the distribution of Open Blocks under an MIT License. Open Blocks visual programming is closely related to StarLogo TNG, a project of STEP, and Scratch, a project of the MIT Media Lab's Lifelong Kindergarten Group led by Mitchel Resnick. App Inventor 2 replaced Open Blocks with Blockly, a blocks editor that runs within a web browser.

The MIT AI2 Companion app enables real-time debugging on connected devices via Wi-Fi, or Universal Serial Bus (USB). In addition to this the user may use an "on computer" emulator available for Windows, MacOS, and Linux.

== Spin-offs ==
In June 2018, a baked version of App Inventor 2 called Kodular was launched. It is promoted as an 'improved' and more modern version of App Inventor 2.

== See also ==
- Android software development
- Logo (programming language)
- Lego Mindstorms
- Windows Phone App Studio
