= XAP (file format) =

Microsoft file format with multiple uses

- Filename extension: .xap
- Internet media type: application/x-silverlight-app
- Type of format: Package management system, file archive
- Container for: Software package
- Extended from: ZIP
- Extended to: APPX

XAP is the file format used to distribute and install application software and middleware onto Microsoft's Windows Phone 7/8/8.1/10 operating system, and is the file format for Silverlight applications. Beginning with Windows Phone 8.1, XAP was replaced by APPX as the file format used to install WinRT apps on the Windows Phone platform, a move which was done by Microsoft in order to unify the app development platforms for Windows Store apps and Windows Phone apps.

XAP files are ZIP file formatted packages, however Microsoft has enabled XAP file encryption, meaning the file can no longer be opened with a standard ZIP extractor. The MIME type associated with XAP files is application/x-silverlight-app.

The Windows Phone Marketplace allows users to download XAP files to an SD card and install them manually.

XAP is also the extension for XACT Audio Projects, openable with the Microsoft Cross-Platform Audio Creation Tool. Silverlight XAP Files are not openable with the Audio Creation Tool, and XACT XAP files are not archives.

== Contents ==
An XAP file is a ZIP archive that usually contains the following files:

- AppManifest.xaml file
- DLLs required

== See also ==
- APK (file format)
- .ipa (file extension)
- App (file format)
- Cabinet (file format) or Zip (file format), for older PocketPC/Windows Mobile devices
- HTML Application (HTA)
- XAML Browser Applications (XBAP)
- APPX
