= Windows 8.1 =

2013 Microsoft operating system version

- Version of the Windows NT operating system

- The default interfaces of Windows 8.1
- Developer: Microsoft
- OS family: Microsoft Windows
- Working state: No longer supported
- Source model: Closed-source; Source-available (through Shared Source Initiative)
- Released to manufacturing: August 27, 2013; 13 years ago
- General availability: October 17, 2013; 13 years ago
- Final release: July 2023 update rollup (6.3.9600.21075) / July 11, 2023; 3 years ago
- Marketing target: Consumer and business
- Update method: Windows Update, Windows Store, Windows Server Update Services
- Supported platforms: IA-32, x86-64
- Kernel type: Hybrid
- Userland: Windows API, .NET Framework, WinRT, NTVDM
- Default user interface: Windows shell (graphical)
- License: Trialware, Microsoft Software Assurance, MSDN subscription, Microsoft Imagine
- Preceded by: Windows 8 (2012)
- Succeeded by: Windows 10 (2015)
- Official website: Windows 8.1 (archived at Wayback Machine)

Support status
- All editions except Windows Embedded 8.1 Industry: Mainstream support ended on January 10, 2018.; Extended support ended on January 10, 2023.; Windows 8 users (except those using Windows Embedded 8 Standard) must install Windows 8.1 to continue receiving updates after January 12, 2016.; Windows Embedded 8.1 Industry: Mainstream support ended on July 10, 2018.; Extended support ended on July 11, 2023.

Windows 8.1 is a release of the Windows NT operating system based on Windows 8 developed by Microsoft. It was released to manufacturing on August 27, 2013, and broadly released for retail sale on October 17, 2013, about a year after the retail release of its predecessor, and succeeded by Windows 10 on July 29, 2015. Windows 8.1 was made available for download via MSDN and Technet and available as a free upgrade for retail copies of Windows 8 and Windows RT users via the Windows Store. A server version, Windows Server 2012 R2, was also released on October 17, 2013.

Windows 8.1 aimed to address complaints of Windows 8 users and reviewers on launch. Enhancements include an improved Start screen, additional snap views, additional bundled apps, tighter OneDrive (formerly SkyDrive) integration, Internet Explorer 11 (IE11), a Bing-powered unified search system, restoration of a visible Start button on the taskbar, and the ability to restore the previous behavior of opening the user's desktop on login instead of the Start screen. Windows 8.1 also added support for then emerging technologies like high-resolution displays, 3D printing, Wi-Fi Direct, and Miracast streaming, as well as the ReFS file system.

Windows 8.1 received more positive reception than Windows 8, with people appreciating the expanded functionality available to apps in comparison to Windows 8, its OneDrive integration, its user interface tweaks, and the addition of expanded tutorials for operating the Windows 8 interface. Despite these improvements, Windows 8.1 was still criticized for not addressing all issues of Windows 8 (such as poor integration between Metro-style apps and the desktop interface), and for potential privacy implications of the expanded use of online services. Windows 8.1 was succeeded by Windows 10 in 2015. Mainstream support for Windows 8.1 ended on January 9, 2018, with extended support ending on January 10, 2023. Mainstream support for the Embedded Industry edition of Windows 8.1 ended on July 10, 2018, and extended support ended on July 11, 2023.

== History ==
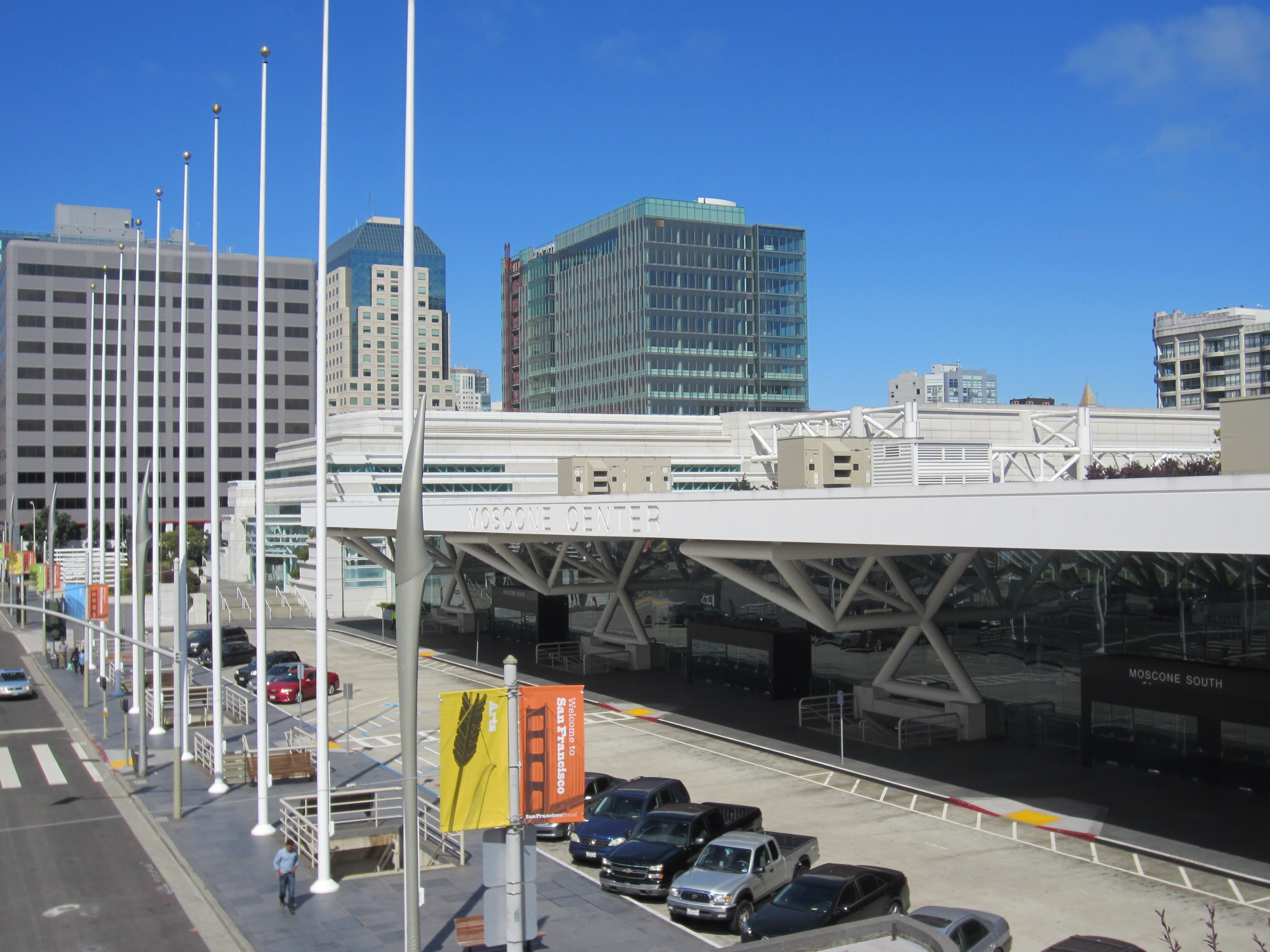
Windows 8.1 was revealed at Build 2013, held at San Francisco's Moscone Center.

In February 2013, ZDNet writer Mary Jo Foley disclosed potential rumors about "Blue", the codename for a wave of planned updates across several Microsoft products and services, including Windows 8, Windows Phone 8, Outlook.com, and SkyDrive. In particular, the report detailed that Microsoft was planning to shift to a more "continuous" development model, which would see major revisions to its main software platforms released on a consistent yearly cycle to keep up with market demands. Lending credibility to the reports, Foley noted that a Microsoft staff member had listed experience with "Windows Blue" on his LinkedIn profile, and listed it as a separate operating system from 8.

A post-RTM build of Windows 8, build 9364, was leaked in March 2013. The build, which was believed to be of "Windows Blue", revealed a number of enhancements across Windows 8's interface, including additional size options for tiles, expanded color options on the Start screen, the expansion of PC Settings to include more options that were previously exclusive to the desktop Control Panel, the ability for apps to snap to half of the screen, the ability to take screenshots from the Share charm, additional stock apps, increased SkyDrive integration (such as automatic device backups) and Internet Explorer 11. Shortly afterward on March 26, 2013, corporate vice president of corporate communications Frank X. Shaw officially acknowledged the "Blue" project, stating that continuous development would be "the new normal" at Microsoft, and that "our product groups are also taking a unified planning approach so people get what they want—all of their devices, apps and services working together wherever they are and for whatever they are doing."

In early May, press reports announcing the upcoming version in Financial Times and The Economist negatively compared Windows 8 to New Coke. The theme was then echoed and debated in the computer press. Shaw rejected this criticism as "extreme", adding that he saw a comparison with Diet Coke as more appropriate.

On May 14, 2013, Microsoft announced that "Blue" was officially unveiled as Windows 8.1. Following a keynote presentation focusing on this version, the public beta of Windows 8.1 was released on June 26, 2013, during Build. Build 9600 of Windows 8.1 was released to OEM hardware partners on August 27, 2013, and became generally available on October 17, 2013. Unlike past releases of Windows and its service packs, volume license customers and subscribers to MSDN Plus and TechNet Plus were unable to obtain the RTM version upon its release; a spokesperson stated that the change in policy was to allow Microsoft to work with OEMs "to ensure a quality experience at general availability." Microsoft stated that Windows 8.1 would be released to the general public on October 17, 2013. However, after criticism, Microsoft reversed its decision and released the RTM build on MSDN and TechNet on September 9, 2013. Microsoft announced that Windows 8.1, along with Windows Server 2012 R2, was released to manufacturing on August 27, 2013. Prior to the release of Windows 8.1, Microsoft premiered a new television commercial in late-September 2013 that focused on its changes as part of the "Windows Everywhere" campaign.

Shortly after its release, Windows RT 8.1 was temporarily recalled by Microsoft following reports that some users had encountered a rare bug which corrupted the operating system's Boot Configuration Data during installation, resulting in an error on startup. On October 21, 2013, Microsoft confirmed that the bug was limited to the original Surface tablet, and only affected 1 in 1000 installations. The company released recovery media and instructions which could be used to repair the device, and restored access to Windows RT 8.1 the next day.

It was also found that changes to screen resolution handling on Windows 8.1 resulted in mouse input lag in certain video games that do not use the DirectInput APIs—particularly first-person shooter games, including Deus Ex: Human Revolution, Hitman: Absolution, and Metro 2033. Users also found the issues to be more pronounced when using gaming mice with high resolution and/or polling rates. Microsoft released a patch to fix the bug on certain games in November 2013, and acknowledged that it was caused by "changes to mouse-input processing for low-latency interaction scenarios".

=== Update ===
On April 8, 2014, Microsoft released the Windows 8.1 Update, which included all past updates plus new features. It was unveiled by Microsoft vice president Joe Belfiore at Mobile World Congress on February 23, 2014, and detailed in full at Microsoft's Build conference on April 2. Belfiore noted that the update would lower the minimum system requirements for Windows, so it can be installed on devices with as little as 1 GB of RAM and 16 GB of storage. Unlike Windows 8.1 itself, this cumulative update is distributed through Windows Update, and must be installed to receive any further patches for Windows 8.1.

At the 2014 Build conference, during April, Microsoft's Terry Myerson unveiled further user interface changes for Windows 8.1, including the ability to run Metro-style apps inside desktop windows, and a revised Start menu, which creates a compromise between the Start menu design used by Windows 7 and the Start screen, by combining the application listing in the first column with a second that can be used to display app tiles, whereas Windows 8.0 used a screen hotspot ("hot corner"). Myerson stated that these changes would occur in a future update, but did not elaborate further. A distinction is the removal of the tooltip with the preview thumbnail of the Start screen.

Microsoft also unveiled a concept known as "Universal Windows Apps", in which a Windows Runtime app could be ported to Windows Phone 8.1 and Xbox One while sharing a common codebase. While it would not entirely unify Windows' app ecosystem with that of Windows Phone, it would allow developers to synchronize data between versions of their app on each platform, and bundle access to Windows, Windows Phone, and Xbox One versions of an app in a single purchase. Microsoft originally announced that users who did not install the update would not receive any other updates after May 13, 2014. However, meeting this deadline proved challenging: The ability to deploy Windows 8.1 Update through Windows Server Update Services (WSUS) was disabled shortly after its release following the discovery of a bug which affects the ability to use WSUS as a whole in certain server configurations. Microsoft later fixed the issue but users continued to report that the update may fail to install. Microsoft's attempt to fix the problem was ineffective, to the point that Microsoft pushed the support deadline further to June 30, 2014. On 16 May, Microsoft released additional updates to fix a problem of BSOD in the update.

== Distribution ==
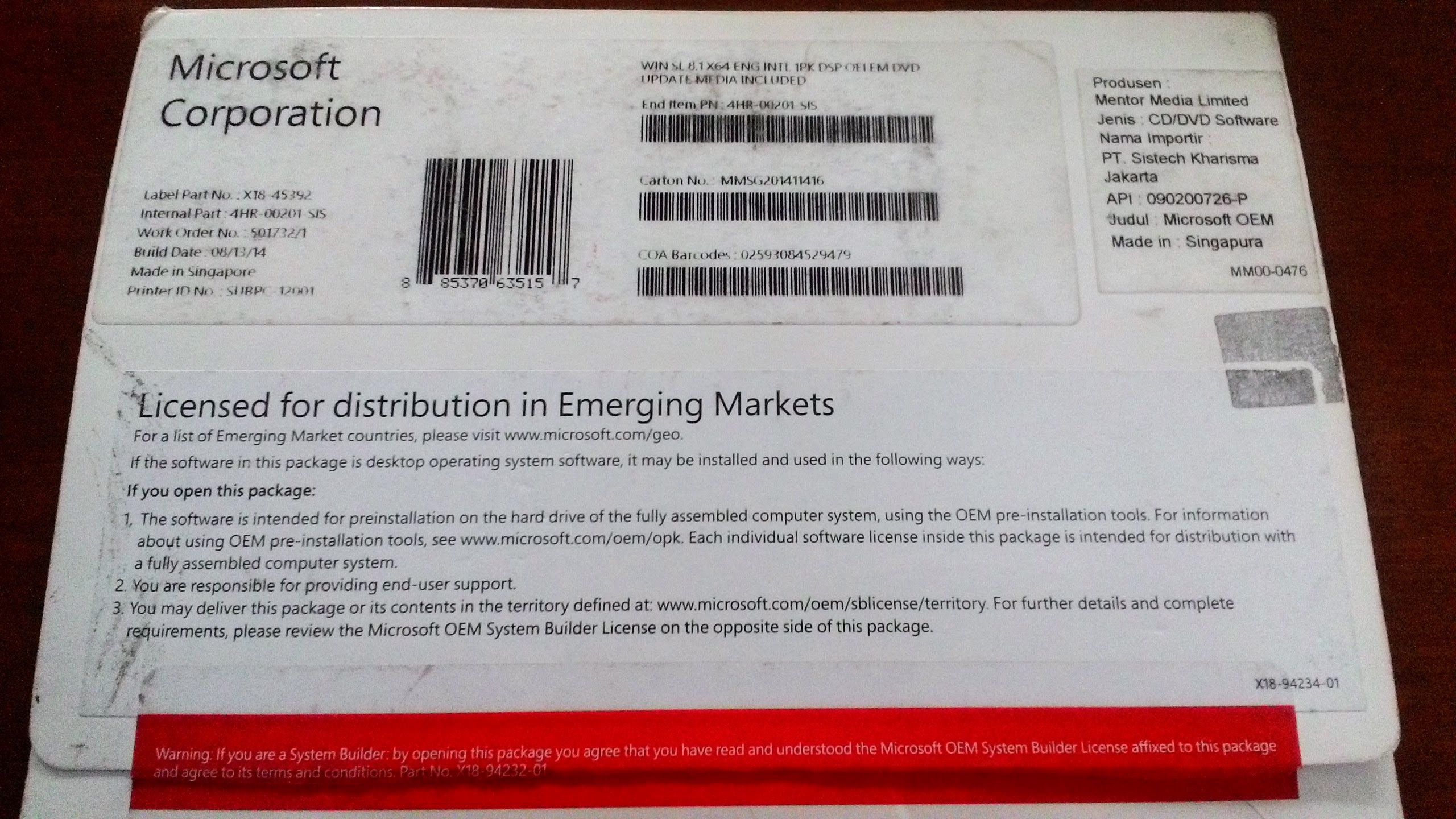
OEM copy of Windows 8.1 Single Language, licensed for distribution in "emerging markets" only

Microsoft markets Windows 8.1 as an "update" for Windows 8, avoiding the term "upgrade". Microsoft's support lifecycle policy treats Windows 8.1 similar to previous service packs of Windows: It is part of Windows 8's support lifecycle, and upgrading to Windows 8.1 is required to maintain access to support and Windows updates after January 12, 2016.

Retail and OEM copies of Windows 8, Windows 8 Pro, and Windows RT can be upgraded through Windows Store free of charge. However, volume license customers, TechNet or MSDN subscribers and users of Windows 8 Enterprise must acquire standalone installation media for Windows 8.1 and install through the traditional Windows setup process, either as an in-place upgrade or clean install. This requires a Windows 8.1-specific product key.

Upgrading through Windows Store requires each machine to download an upgrade package as big as 2–3.6 GB. Unlike the traditional Windows service packs, the standalone installer, which could be downloaded once and installed as many times as needed, requires a Windows 8.1-specific product key. On July 1, 2014, acknowledging difficulties users may have had through the Windows Store update method, Microsoft began to phase in an automatic download process for Windows 8.1.

Windows 8 was re-issued at retail as Windows 8.1 alongside the online upgrade for those who did not currently own a Windows 8 license. Retail copies of Windows 8.1 contain "Full" licenses that can be installed on any computer, regardless of their existing operating system, unlike Windows 8 retail copies, which were only available at retail with upgrade licenses. Microsoft stated that the change was in response to customer feedback, and to allow more flexibility for users. Pricing for the retail copies of Windows 8.1 remained the same.

Windows 8.1 with Bing is a reduced-cost SKU of Windows 8.1 that was introduced by Microsoft in May 2014 in an effort to further encourage the production of low-cost Windows devices, while "driving end-user usage of Microsoft Services such as Bing and OneDrive". It is subsidized by Microsoft's Bing search engine, which is set as the default within Internet Explorer and cannot be changed by OEMs. However, this restriction does not apply to end-users, who can still change the default search engine freely. It is otherwise and functionally identical to the base edition of Windows 8.1.

== New and changed features ==
Many of the changes on Windows 8.1, particularly to the user interface, were made in response to criticisms from early adopters and other critics after the release of Windows 8.

=== User interface and desktop ===
The Start screen received several enhancements on Windows 8.1, including an extended "All Apps" view with sort modes (accessed by clicking a new down arrow button or swiping upward), small and extra-large sizes for tiles, and colored tiles for desktop program shortcuts. Additional customization options were also added, such as expanded color options, new backgrounds (some of which incorporate animated elements), and the ability for the Start screen to use the desktop background instead. Applications were no longer added to the Start screen automatically when installed, and all applications now have colored tiles (desktop programs were previously shown in a single color). The app snapping system was also extended; up to four apps can be snapped onto a single display depending on screen size, apps can be snapped to fill half the screen, and can also be used on any display in a multi-monitor configuration. Apps can also launch other apps in a snapped view to display content; for example, the Mail app can open a photo attachment in a picture viewer snapped to another half of the screen. Improved support is also provided by apps for using devices in a portrait (vertical) orientation. The lock screen offers the ability to use a photo slideshow as its backdrop, and a shortcut to the Camera app by swiping up. The on-screen keyboard has an improved autocomplete mechanism which displays multiple word suggestions, and allows users to select from them by sliding on the spacebar. The autocomplete dictionary is also automatically updated using data from Bing, allowing it to recognize and suggest words relating to current trends and events. Similarly to Windows Phone, certain apps now display a narrow bar with three dots on it to indicate the presence of a pop-up menu accessible by swiping, clicking on the dots, or right-clicking.

To improve the usability of the desktop interface, a visible Start button was restored to the taskbar for opening the Start screen, and the Quick Links menu (accessed by right-clicking the Start button or pressing ⊞ Win+X) now contains shutdown and sign-out options. Users can also modify certain user interface behaviors, such as disabling the upper hot corners for using the charms and recent apps list, going to the desktop instead of the Start screen on login or after closing all apps on a screen, automatically opening the "All Apps" view on the Start screen when opened, and prioritizing desktop programs on the "Category" sort mode on "All Apps". To assist users in learning the Windows 8 user interface, an interactive tutorial was also offered, along with a new Help + Tips app for additional information. In contrast, Windows RT 8.1 downplays the desktop interface further by not displaying the Desktop tile on its default Start screen at all (however, it can still be manually added to the Start screen).

Windows manager Chaitanya Sareen stated that the restoration of the visible Start button was intended to be a "warm blanket" for users who had become confused by the removal of the button on 8; the Start button was originally removed to reflect Windows 8's treatment of the desktop as an "app" rather than the main interface.

Further interface behavior changes are made on the April 2014 "Windows 8.1 Update", which are oriented towards non-touch environments (such as desktop and laptop PCs) that use a keyboard and mouse, and improve integration between Windows Store apps and the desktop. When a mouse is in use, the Desktop is shown on startup by default, the Start screen uses context menus instead of a toolbar across the bottom of the screen for manipulating tiles, an autohiding title bar with minimize and close buttons is displayed within apps at the top of the screen, the taskbar can display and pin apps alongside desktop programs and be accessed from within apps, and visible search and power buttons are added to the Start screen. In non-touch environments, the default image viewer and media player programs were changed back to Windows Photo Viewer and Windows Media Player in lieu of the Xbox Video and Photos apps.

=== Apps ===
The suite of pre-loaded apps bundled with Windows 8 were changed in Windows 8.1; PC Settings was expanded to include options that were previously exclusive to the desktop Control Panel, Windows Store was updated with an improved interface for browsing apps and automatic updates, the Mail app includes an updated interface and additional features, the Camera app integrates Photosynth for creating panoramas, and additional editing tools were added to the Photos app (while integration with Flickr and Facebook was completely removed). A number of additional stock apps were also added, including Calculator, Food and Drink, Health and Fitness, Sound Recorder, Reading List (which can be used to collect and sync content from apps through OneDrive), Scan, and Help + Tips. For Windows RT users, Windows 8.1 also adds a version of Microsoft Outlook to the included Office 2013 RT suite. However, it does not support data loss protection, Group Policy, Lync integration, or creating emails with information rights management. Windows Store is enabled by default within Windows To Go environments. On January 31, 2020, Microsoft released the new Microsoft Edge web browser for Windows 8.1.

=== Online services and functionality ===
Windows 8.1 adds tighter integration with several Microsoft-owned services. OneDrive (formerly SkyDrive) is integrated at the system level to sync user settings and files. Files are automatically downloaded in the background when they are accessed from the user's OneDrive folder, unless they are marked to be available offline. By default, only file metadata and thumbnails are stored locally, and reparse points are used to give the appearance of a normal directory structure to provide backward compatibility. The OneDrive app was updated to include a local file manager. OneDrive use on Windows 8.1 requires that a user's Windows account be linked to a Microsoft account; the previous SkyDrive desktop client (which did not have this requirement) is not supported on Windows 8.1.

A Bing-based unified search system was added; it can analyze a user's search habits to return results featuring relevant local and online content. Full-screen "hero" displays aggregate news articles, Wikipedia entries, multimedia, and other content related to a search query: for instance, searching for a music performer would return photos of the performer, a biography, and their available songs and albums on Xbox Music. The messaging app from Windows 8 has been replaced by Skype, which also allows users to accept calls directly from the lock screen. Windows 8.1 also includes Internet Explorer 11, which adds support for SPDY and WebGL, and expanded developer tools. The Metro-style variant of IE11 also adds tab syncing, the ability to open an unlimited number of tabs, and Reading List integration.

Due to Facebook Connect service changes, Facebook support is disabled in all bundled apps effective June 8, 2015.

=== Security and hardware compatibility ===
On compatible hardware, Windows 8.1 also features a transparent "device encryption" system based on BitLocker. Encryption begins as soon as a user begins using the system; the recovery key is stored to either the user's Microsoft account or an Active Directory login, allowing it to be retrieved from any computer. While device encryption is offered on all editions of Windows 8.1 unlike BitLocker (which is exclusive to the Pro and Enterprise editions), device encryption requires that the device meet the Connected Standby specification and have a Trusted Platform Module (TPM) 2.0 chip. Windows 8.1 also introduces improved fingerprint recognition APIs, which allows user login, User Account Control, Windows Store and Windows Store apps to use enrolled fingerprints as an authentication method. A new kiosk mode known as "Assigned Access" was also added, allowing a device to be configured to use a single app in a restricted environment. Additionally, Windows Defender includes an intrusion detection system which can scan network activity for signs of malware. Windows 8.1 also allows third-party VPN clients to automatically trigger connections.

For enterprise device management, Windows 8.1 adds support for the Workplace Join feature of Windows Server 2012 R2, which allows users to enroll their own device into corporate networks with finer control over access to resources and security requirements. Windows 8.1 also supports the OMA Device Management specifications. Remote Data Control can be used to remotely wipe specific "corporate" data from Windows 8.1 devices.

The 64-bit variants of Windows 8.1 no longer support processors which do not implement the double-width compare and exchange (CMPXCHG16B) CPU instruction (which the installer reports as a lack of support for "CompareExchange128") and processors prior to the Intel Core and AMD 10h microarchitectures (which the installer reports as enforcing these architectures). A Microsoft spokesperson noted that the change primarily affects systems with older AMD 64-bit processors, and that "the number of affected processors are extremely small since this instruction has been supported for greater than 10 years." It mostly concerns Socket 754 and Socket 939 Athlon 64 from 2004 and 2005; the Socket AM2 CPUs all require at least the K10 microarchitecture as well as the instruction. Brad Chacos of PC World also reported a case in which Windows 8.1 rejected Intel Core 2 Quad Q9300 and a Q9550S despite their support for this instruction, because the associated Intel DP35DP motherboard did not. Despite the entirety of that, these changes do not affect the 32-bit editions of Windows 8.1.

=== Hardware functionality ===
Windows 8.1 adds support for 3D printing, pairing with printers using NFC tags, Wi-Fi Direct, Miracast media streaming, tethering, and NVMe. In response to the increasing pixel density in displays, Windows 8.1 can scale text and GUI elements up to 200% (whereas Windows 8 supported only 150%) and set scaling settings independently on each display in multi-monitor configurations.

== Removed features ==
Backup and Restore, the backup component of Windows that had been deprecated but was available in Windows 8 through a Control Panel applet called "Windows 7 File Recovery", was removed.

Windows 8.1 also removes the graphical user interface for the Windows System Assessment Tool, meaning that the Windows Experience Index is no longer displayed. The command line variant of the tool remains available on the system. Microsoft reportedly removed the graphical Windows Experience Index to promote the idea that all kinds of hardware run Windows 8 equally well.

Windows 8.1 removed the ability of several Universal Windows Platform apps to act as "hubs" connecting similar services within a single interface:

- The Photos app lost the ability to view photos from Facebook, Flickr or SkyDrive (branded as OneDrive since February 2014). Instead, each service provider is expected to create its own app;
- The Messaging app, which was interoperable with Windows Live Messenger and Facebook Chat, was deprecated in favor of a Skype app that is not compatible with Facebook Chat;
- The Calendar app can only connect to Microsoft services such as Outlook.com and Microsoft Exchange, with support for Google Calendar removed.

Since October 2016, all future patches are cumulative as with Windows 10; individual patches can no longer be downloaded.

Users can only upgrade their previous version of Windows to Windows 8.1 using the revised installer introduced in Windows 8: they can no longer use setup.exe in the sources folder to upgrade their system.

== Reception ==
Windows 8.1 received more positive reviews than Windows 8. Tom Warren of The Verge still considered the platform to be a "work in progress" due to the number of apps available, the impaired level of capabilities that apps have in comparison to desktop programs, and because he felt that mouse and keyboard navigation was still "awkward". However, he touted many of the major changes on Windows 8.1, such as the expanded snapping functionality, increased Start screen customization, SkyDrive and Bing integration, improvements to stock apps, and particularly he considered the Mail app to be "lightyears ahead" of the original version from 8. He concluded that "Microsoft has achieved a lot within 12 months, even if a lot of the additions feel like they should have been there from the very start with Windows 8."

Joel Hruska of ExtremeTech criticized continuing integration problems between the Desktop and apps on Windows 8.1, pointing out examples such as the Photos app, which "still refuses to acknowledge that users might have previous photo directories", and that the Mail app "still can't talk to the desktop—if you try to send an email from the Desktop without another mail client installed, Windows will tell you there's no mail client capable of performing that action." However, he praised the improvements to other apps, such as People and News (pointing out UI improvements, and the News app using proper links when sharing stories, rather than non-standard links that can only be recognized by the app). Although praising the more flexible snapping system, he still pointed out flaws, such as an inability to maintain snap configurations in certain situations. Windows 8.1's search functionality was met with mixed reviews; while noting the Bing integration and updated design, the system was panned for arbitrarily leaving out secondary storage devices from the "Everything" mode.

Peter Bright of Ars Technica praised many of the improvements on Windows 8.1, such as its more "complete" touch interface, the "reasonable" tutorial content, the new autocomplete tools on the on-screen keyboard, software improvements, and the deep SkyDrive integration. However, he felt that the transition between the desktop and apps "still tends to feel a bit disjointed and disconnected" (even though the option to use the desktop wallpaper on the Start screen made it feel more integrated with the desktop interface rather than dissimilar), and that the restoration of the Start button made the two interfaces feel even more inconsistent because of how different it operates between the desktop and apps.

Certain aspects of Windows 8.1 were also cause for concern because of their privacy implications. In his review of Windows 8.1, Joel Hruska noted that Microsoft had deliberately made it harder for users to create a "Local" account that is not tied to a Microsoft account for syncing, as it "[makes] clear that the company really, really, wants you to share everything you do with it, and that's not something an increasing number of people and businesses are comfortable doing." Woody Leonhard of InfoWorld noted that by default Windows 8.1's "Smart Search" system sends search queries and other information to Microsoft, which could be used for targeted advertising. Leonhard considered this to be ironic, given that Microsoft had criticized Google's use of similar tactics with its "Scroogled" advertising campaign.

=== Market share ===
According to Net Applications, the adoption rate in February 2025 for Windows 8.1 was 0.31%. Windows 8.1 reached a peak adoption rate of 13.12% in June 2015 compared with Windows 8 peak adoption rate of 8.02% in September 2013.

== See also ==
- Comparison of operating systems
- History of operating systems
- List of operating systems
- Microsoft Windows version history
