= Microsoft Build =

Annual conference event held by Microsoft

- Logo since 2011
- Begins: June 2, 2026
- Ends: June 3, 2026
- Frequency: Annual
- Venue: San Francisco Fort Mason Center and Digital
- Locations: Anaheim, California, Redmond, Washington, San Francisco, California, Seattle, Washington
- Founded: September 2011; 15 years ago
- Most recent: June 2 to 3, 2026
- Participants: 5,000
- Organizer: Microsoft
- Website: build.microsoft.com

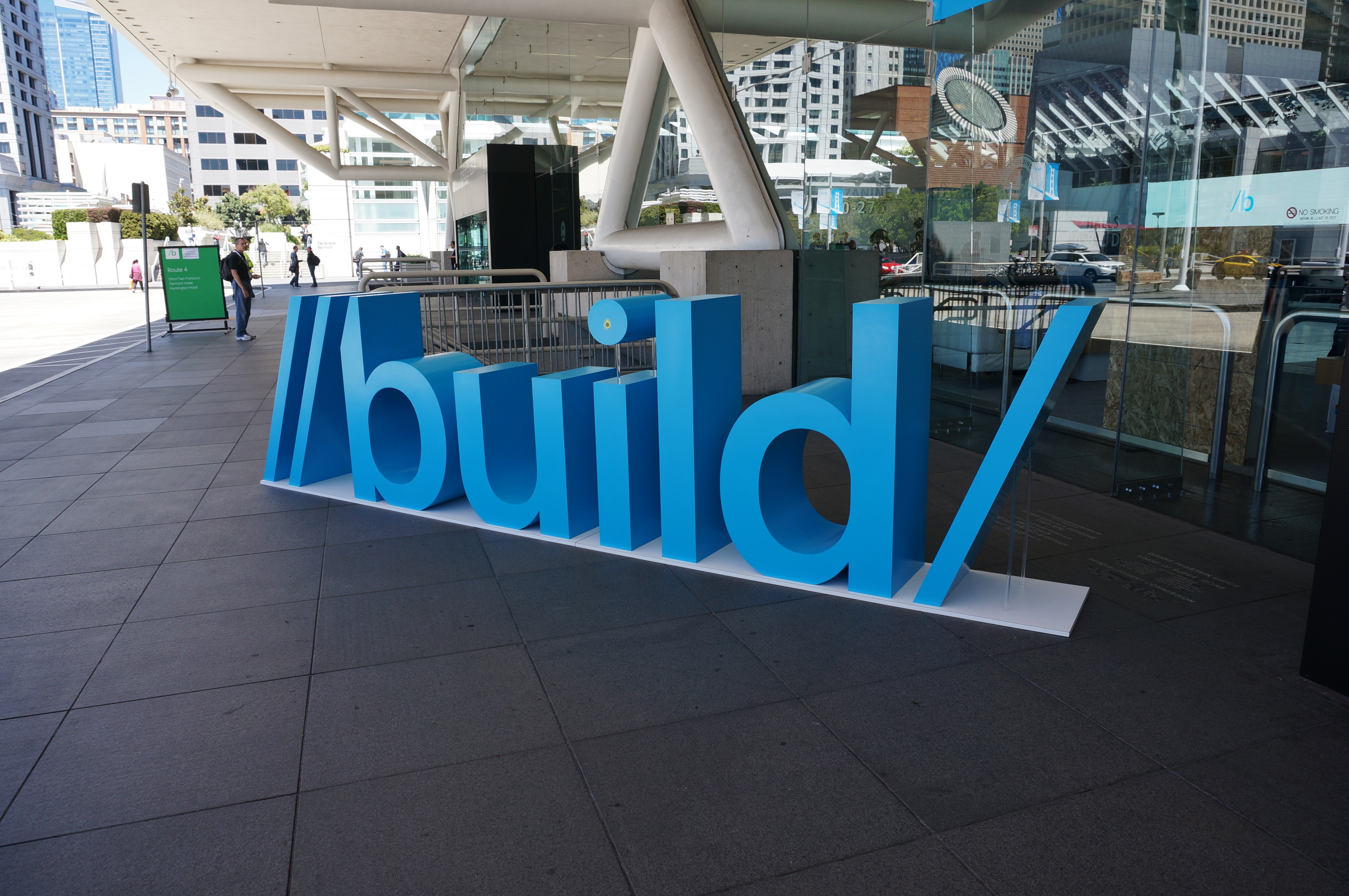
Sign for Microsoft's Build 2013 conference at the Moscone Center entrance in San Francisco

Microsoft Build (often stylized as //build/) is an annual conference event held by Microsoft, aimed at software engineers and web developers using Windows, Microsoft Azure and other Microsoft technologies. First held in 2011, it serves as a successor for Microsoft's previous developer events, the Professional Developers Conference (an infrequent event which covered development of software for the Windows operating system) and MIX (which covered web development centering on Microsoft technology such as Silverlight and ASP.net). The attendee price was (US)$2,195 in 2016, up from $2,095 in 2015. It sold out quickly, within one minute of the registration site opening in 2016.

== Format ==
The event has been held at a large convention center, or purpose-built meeting space on the Microsoft Campus. The Keynote on the first day has been led by the Microsoft CEO addressing the press and developers. It has been the place to announce the general technology milestones for developers. There are breakout sessions conducted by engineers and program managers, most often Microsoft employees representing their particular initiatives. The keynote on the second day often includes deeper dives into technology. Thousands of developers and technologists from all over the world attend.

== Events ==
Microsoft Build events
Year	Dates	Venue
2011	September 13–16	Anaheim Convention Center
2012	October 30–November 2	Microsoft campus
2013	June 26–28	Moscone Center (North & South)
2014	April 2–4	Moscone Center (West)
2015	April 29–May 1	Moscone Center (West)
2016	March 30–April 1	Moscone Center
2017	May 10–12	Washington State Convention Center
2018	May 7–9	Washington State Convention Center
2019	May 6–8	Washington State Convention Center
2020	May 19–21	Digital
2021	May 25–27	Digital
2022	May 24–26	Digital
2023	May 23–25	Seattle Convention Center
2024	May 21–23	Seattle Convention Center
2025	May 19–22	Seattle Convention Center
2026	June 2–3	Fort Mason Center

=== 2011 ===
Build 2011 was held from September 13 to September 16, 2011 in Anaheim, California. The conference heavily focused on Windows 8, Windows Server 2012 and Visual Studio 2012; their Developer Preview versions were also released during the conference. Attendees also received a Samsung tablet shipping with the Windows 8 "Developer Preview" build.

=== 2012 ===
Held on Microsoft's campus in Redmond from October 30 to November 2, 2012, the 2012 edition of Build focused on the recently released Windows 8, along with Windows Azure and Windows Phone 8. Attendees received a Surface RT tablet with Touch Cover, a Nokia Lumia 920 smartphone, and 100GB of free SkyDrive storage.

=== 2013 ===
Build 2013 was held from June 26 to June 28, 2013 at the Moscone Center (North and South) in San Francisco. The conference was primarily used to unveil the Windows 8.1 update for Windows 8. Each attendee received a Surface Pro, Acer Iconia W3 (the first 8-inch Windows 8 tablet) with a Bluetooth keyboard, one year of Adobe Creative Cloud and 100GB of free SkyDrive storage.

=== 2014 ===
Build 2014 was held at the Moscone Center (West) in San Francisco from April 2 to April 4, 2014. Build attendees received a free Xbox One and a $500 Microsoft Store gift card.

Highlights:

- Windows Display Driver Model 2.0 and DirectX 12
- Microsoft Cortana
- Windows Phone 8.1
- Windows 8.1 Spring Update
- Windows free on all devices with a screen size of 9" or less and on IoT
- Bing Knowledge widget and app linking
- .NET Native (Announcement, Product Page)
- .NET Compiler Platform (Roslyn)
- Visual Studio 2013 Update 2 RC
- Team Foundation Server 2013 Update 2 RTM
- TypeScript 1.0
- .NET Foundation

=== 2015 ===
Build 2015 was held at the Moscone Center (West) in San Francisco from April 29 to May 1, 2015. Registration fee is $2095, and opened at 9:00am PST on Thursday, January 22 and "sold out" in under an hour with an unspecified number of attendees. Build attendees received a free HP Spectre x360 ultrabook.

Highlights:

- Windows 10
- Windows 10 Mobile
- HoloLens and Windows Holographic
- Windows Server 2016
- Microsoft Exchange Server 2016
- Visual Studio 2015
- Visual Studio Code

=== 2016 ===
Build 2016 was held at the Moscone Center in San Francisco from March 30 to April 1, 2016. The price was $2195, an increase of $100 compared to the previous year. The conference was sold out in 1 minute. Unlike previous years, there were no hardware gifts for attendees.

Highlights:

- Windows Subsystem for Linux
- Cortana chatbot on Skype
- "Power of the Pen and the PC"
- .NET Standard Library
- ASP.NET Core
- Browser extension support for Edge
- Windows 10 Anniversary Update
- Xamarin
  - Free for individuals, open source projects, academic research, education, and small professional teams.
  - Remoted iOS Simulator for Windows

=== 2017 ===
The 2017 Build conference took place at the Washington State Convention Center in Downtown Seattle, Washington from May 10 to May 12, 2017. It had been at Moscone Center for the previous four years. However, Moscone center was undergoing renovations from April through August 2017. The Seattle location brought the conference close to the Microsoft headquarters in Redmond, Washington. The price remained at $2195 for the 2017 conference. There were no devices given away at this conference to attendees.

Highlights:

- Azure Cosmos DB
- Visual Studio for Mac
- WSL: Fedora and SUSE support
- Xamarin Live Player
- Windows 10 Fall Creators Update
- Microsoft Fluent Design System

=== 2018 ===
The 2018 Build conference took place at the Washington State Convention Center in Downtown Seattle, Washington May 7 to May 9, 2018. The price has increased $300 to $2495 for the 2018 conference. The conference was preceded by the Windows Developer Awards 2018 ceremony.

Highlights:

- .NET
  - .NET Core 3
  - ML.NET
- Azure
  - Azure CDN
  - Azure Confidential Computing
  - Azure Database Migration Service
  - Azure Maps
- Microsoft 365
- Microsoft Store: increased developer revenue share (95%; Non-Game App via deeplink only)
- Visual Studio
  - App Center
  - IntelliCode
  - Live Share
- Windows 10 Redstone 5
  - Cloud Clipboard
  - Microsoft Notepad: Unix/Linux EOL support
- Xamarin
  - Hyper-V Android Emulator
  - Automatic iOS Device Provisioning
  - Xamarin.Essentials
  - Xamarin.Forms 3.0

=== 2019 ===
The 2019 Build conference took place at the Washington State Convention Center in Downtown Seattle, Washington from May 6 to May 8, 2019 plus optional post-event learning activities on next two days. The price decreased $100 to $2395 for the 2019 conference. Registration started on February 27.

Highlights:

- .NET 5: next multi-platform .NET Core
- Azure: Azure SQL Database Edge
- Fluid Framework
- Visual Studio: IntelliCode
- Visual Studio Code: Remote Development Extension Pack
- Visual Studio Online
- Windows Subsystem for Linux 2
- Windows Terminal: cmd.exe, PowerShell, and WSL in tabs

=== 2020 ===
Microsoft announced the dates for Build 2020, and their other large conferences on September 16, 2019, with pricing set at $2395. The physical 2020 Build conference was scheduled to take place in downtown Seattle, Washington from May 19 to May 21, 2020, but it was initially cancelled due to the COVID-19 pandemic. On April 20, 2020, Microsoft opened sign-ups for a replacement, virtual event, held the same date as the originally intended physical event; the virtual event was a free of charge.

Highlights:

- .NET Multi-platform App UI (.NET MAUI) (preview)
- Windows Subsystem for Linux (WSL)
  - GPU support (for CUDA and DirectML)
- Windows Package Manager (winget) (preview)

=== 2021 ===
The 2021 conference was once again a free-of-charge virtual event, and was held on May 25 to 27, 2021.

Highlights:

- .NET 6
- Azure
  - Azure AI Services
  - Azure Bot Service
  - Azure Metrics Advisor
  - Azure Video Analyzer
  - Azure Cognitive Services
- Power Fx
- PyTorch Enterprise on Microsoft Azure
- Microsoft Build of OpenJDK
- Windows Subsystem for Linux GUI (WSLg)
- Windows Package Manager 1.0 (winget)

=== 2022 ===
The 2022 conference, once again a free-of-charge virtual event, was held on May 24 to 26, 2022.

Highlights:

- .NET Multi-platform App UI (.NET MAUI) (general availability)
- TypeScript 4.7

=== 2023 ===
The 2023 conference was announced on March 14, 2023. A free online part was held from May 23 to 24, and an in-person part was held in Seattle from May 23 to 25 with workshops on May 22 making this the first Build event to be held as a in-person format since 2019. Tickets for the in-person event are $1525 and workshops are $225.

Microsoft Build 2023 focused heavily on artificial intelligence and its integration across Microsoft's products and services.

- Microsoft introduced its AI chatbot, Copilot, to Windows 11. Copilot is already integrated into Edge, Office apps, and GitHub. It will be available from June, offering users a range of assistance, from simple to complex tasks.
- Microsoft announced the integration of Bing with OpenAI's ChatGPT, making Bing the default search engine for ChatGPT. This functionality is first available for ChatGPT Plus users and will be enabled for all free ChatGPT users later.

In addition to AI-focused announcements, Microsoft introduced updates to Windows 11, Microsoft 365, Edge, and Teams. The company also expanded its plugin platform in collaboration with OpenAI, allowing developers to submit their AI experiences to the Microsoft Store on Windows.

=== 2024 ===
Highlights:

- Copilot+ PC
  - Windows Copilot Library
- .NET Aspire: cloud-native stack for building observable, production ready, distributed applications.

=== 2025 ===
Highlights: AI agents, Azure AI Foundry, Windows AI Foundry, GitHub Copilot upgrades, NLWeb and MCP.

=== 2026 ===
Build 2026 was moved from Seattle to San Francisco due to Microsoft’s concerns about attendees’ perception of the cleanliness of Seattle’s streets and the presence of unhoused individuals, among other reasons.

The conference was shortened from 3 days to 2 and was located at the San Francisco Fort Mason Center. In person attendance cost $1099 while online attendance remained free. Unlike previous years, Microsoft required in person attendees to submit an application to attend due to the limited space. The conference focused heavily on AI tools and systems., with Microsoft claiming "This event is designed for AI developers, technical leaders, and enterprise developers."

=== Attendee party venues ===
- 2011: The Grove
- 2012: Seattle Armory
- 2013: Pier 48
- 2014: AMC Metreon
- 2015: AMC Metreon
- 2016: Block Party Yerba Ln
- 2017: CenturyLink Field
- 2018: Museum of Pop Culture / Chihuly Garden and Glass
- 2019: CenturyLink Field
- 2020: Online
- 2021: Online
- 2022: Online
- 2023: Seattle Convention Center
- 2024: Lumen Field
- 2025: Lumen Field
- 2025: Fort Mason

== See also ==
- Microsoft
- Microsoft Ignite
- Worldwide Developers Conference
- Google I/O
- Hackathon
- Samsung Developer Conference (SDC)
