= Universal Windows Platform apps =

Applications usable across all compatible Microsoft Windows devices

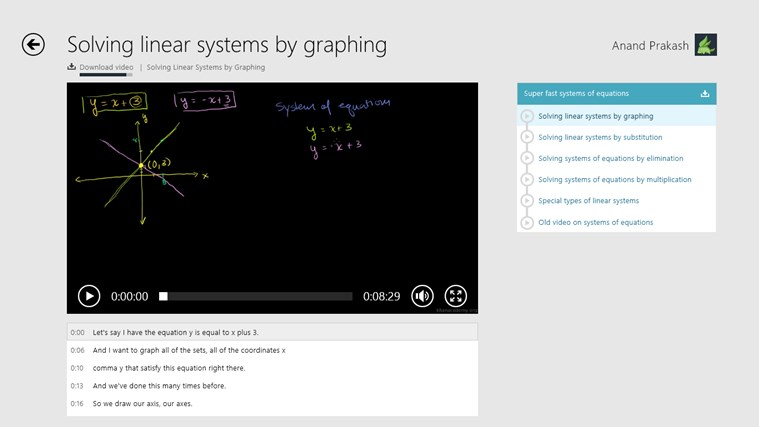
Khan Academy, an example of a Metro-style app

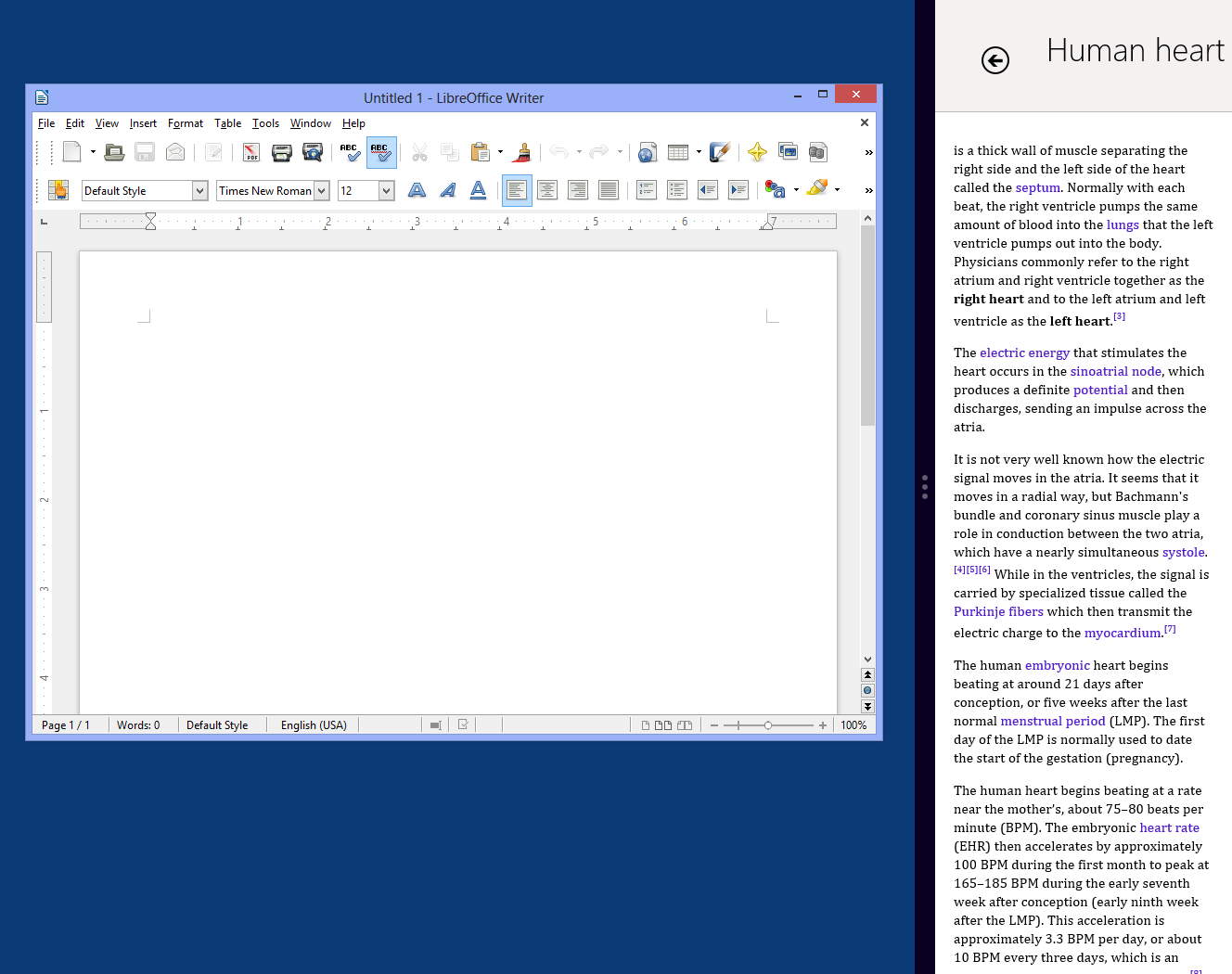
Left: A traditional desktop app without contents; it is showing 60 graphical widgets, and a thick border. Right: Metro-style app; entirely composed of contents

Universal Windows Platform (UWP) apps (formerly named Windows Store apps, Metro-style apps and Modern apps) are applications that are built on the Universal Windows Platform. They are primarily purchased and downloaded via the Microsoft Store, Microsoft's digital application storefront and can be used across all compatible Microsoft Windows devices since Windows 8. UWP stopped most new feature development in October 2021, but toolchain and other updates continue to be made.

== Nomenclature ==
Starting with Windows 10, Microsoft initially used the term "Windows app" to describe Universal Windows Platform (UWP) apps. These were applications that could be installed from the Microsoft Store, previously known as the Windows Store. Initially, these apps were called "Trusted Windows Store apps," and later they were referred to as "Trusted Microsoft Store apps." Traditional programs designed to run on desktop computers were referred to as "desktop apps."

With the release of the Windows 10, version 1903, there was a shift in the terminology. Microsoft began using the term "Apps" to refer to both UWP apps and desktop apps indiscriminately. This change aimed to unify the naming convention for all types of applications.

Note that UWP is primarily used in Microsoft's developer documentation to specifically refer to the platform itself. Microsoft also introduced the term "Windows Runtime app" retrospectively to describe the precursors of UWP apps, as there was previously no clear and unambiguous name for them.

== In Windows 8.x ==
UWP apps first became available under the name "Metro-style apps" in 2012 and were marketed with Windows 8.

=== Look and feel ===
In Windows 8.x, Metro-style apps do not run in a window. Instead, they either occupy the entire screen or are snapped to one side, in which case they occupy the entire height of the screen but only part of its width. They have no title bar, system menu, window borders or control buttons. Command interfaces like scroll bars are usually hidden on start. Menus are located in the "settings charm." Metro-style apps use the UI controls of Windows 8.x and typically follow Windows 8.x UI guidelines, such as horizontal scrolling and the inclusion of edge-UIs, like the app bar.

In response to criticism from customers a title bar was added in Windows 8.1, but was hidden unless users move the mouse cursor to the top of the screen. However, the Hamburger button on the title bar gives access to the charms.

=== Distribution and licensing ===
For most users, the only point of entry for Metro-style apps is the Windows Store. Enterprises operating a Windows domain infrastructure may enter into a contract with Microsoft that allows them to sideload their line-of-business Metro-style apps, circumventing Windows Store. Also, major web browser vendors are selectively exempted from this rule, they are allowed to circumvent Microsoft guidelines and Windows Store and run a Metro-style version of themselves if the user chooses to make their product the default web browser.

Windows RT requires all installed apps to be from the Windows Store, or be verified by Microsoft (most internal applications).

=== Multiple copies ===
Before Windows 8, programs were identified by their static computer icons. The Windows taskbar was responsible for representing every app that had a window while running. Metro-style apps, however, are identified by their "tiles" that can show their icon and also other dynamic contents. In addition, in Windows 8 and Windows 8.1 RTM, they are not shown on the Windows taskbar when they run, but on a dedicated app switcher on the left side of the screen. Windows 8.1 Update added taskbar icons for Metro-style apps.

There is no set limit on how many copies of desktop apps can run simultaneously. For example, one user may run as many copies of programs such as Windows Notepad, Paint or Firefox as long as the system resources can support. (Some desktop apps, such as Windows Media Player, have extra code that prevents spawning more than one instance.) However, in Windows 8, only one copy of Metro-style apps may run at any given time. True multi-instancing of these apps were not available until Windows 10 version 1803 (released in May 2018).

== In Windows 10 and Windows 11 ==
=== Look and feel ===
UWP apps are designed by individuals or software companies which leads to apps having their own look and feel. However, UWP apps built specifically for Windows 10 and 11 typically appear and function differently than ones on older versions, as they use new UI controls that look different from those of previous versions of Windows. The exception to this are apps that use custom UI, which is especially the case with video games. Apps designed for Windows 8.x look significantly different from those designed for Windows 10 and 11.

UWP apps can also look almost identical to traditional desktop apps, using the same legacy UI controls from Windows versions dating back to Windows 95. These are legacy desktop apps that are converted to the UWP apps and distributed using the APPX file format.

=== Multitasking ===
In Windows 10, most UWP apps, even those designed for Windows 8.x, are run in floating windows, and users can use the Windows taskbar and Task View to switch between both UWP apps and desktop apps. Windows 10 also introduced "Tablet Mode". This mode is by default disabled on desktop computers and enabled on tablet computers, but desktop users can switch it on or off manually. When the Tablet Mode is off, apps may have resizable windows and visible title bars. When the Tablet Mode is enabled, resizable apps use the windowing system similar to that of Metro-style apps on Windows 8.x in that they are forced to either occupy the whole screen or be snapped to one side.

UWP apps in Windows 10 can open in multiple windows. Microsoft Edge, Calculator, and Photos are examples of apps that allow this. Windows 10 v1803 (released in May 2018) added true multi-instancing capabilities, so that multiple independent copies of a UWP app can run.

=== Licensing and distribution ===
UWP apps can be downloaded from Windows Store or can be sideloaded. The sideloading requirements were reduced significantly from Windows 8.x to 10, but the app must still be signed by a trusted digital certificate that chains to a root certificate.

== Lifecycle ==
Metro-style apps are suspended when they are closed; suspended apps are terminated automatically as needed by a Windows app manager. Dynamic tiles, background components and contracts (interfaces for interacting with other apps) may require an app to be activated before a user starts it.

Invoking an arbitrary Metro-style app or UWP app from the command line was first introduced in the Insider build 16226 of Windows 10, which was released on 21 June 2017.

== Development ==
=== Windows Runtime ===
Traditionally, Windows software is developed using the Windows API. Software has access to the Windows API with no arbitrary restrictions. Developers were free to choose their own programming language and development tools. Metro-style apps can only be developed using Windows Runtime (WinRT). (Note that not every app using WinRT is a Metro-style app.) A limited subset of WinRT is also available for conventional desktop apps. Calling a forbidden API disqualifies the app from appearing on Windows Store.

Metro-style apps can only be developed using Microsoft's own development tools. According to Allen Bauer, Chief Scientist of Embarcadero Technologies, there are APIs that every computer program must call but Microsoft has forbidden them, except when the call comes from Microsoft's own Visual C++ runtime.

=== Universal apps ===
UWP apps developed to work on smartphones, personal computers, video game consoles and HoloLens. They were initially called universal apps because they derived their platform flexibility from the universal apps API, first introduced in Windows 8.1 and Windows Phone 8.1. Visual Studio 2013 with Update 2 could be used to develop these apps. Windows 10 introduced the Universal Windows Platform (UWP) 10 API for developing universal apps. Apps that take advantage of this platform are developed with Visual Studio 2015 or later. Older Metro-style apps for Windows 8.1, Windows Phone 8.1 or for both (universal 8.1) need modifications to migrate to this platform.

Universal apps no longer indicate having been written for a specific OS in their manifest; instead, they target one or more device families, e.g. desktop, mobile, console or Internet of Things (IoT). They react to the capabilities that become available to the device. A universal app may run on both a mobile phone and a tablet and provide a suitable experience. The universal app running on the mobile phone may start behaving the way it would on a tablet when the phone is connected to a monitor or a suitable docking station.

UWP is an extension of Windows Runtime and has access to WinRT APIs, although whether UWP apps can take advantage of WinRT APIs depends on their programming language and its tooling.

=== APPX ===
APPX
- Filename extension: .appx, .appxbundle
- Developed by: Microsoft
- Type of format: Archive
- Container for: Installation information and an EXE or MSI file
- Contained by: ZIP, OPC
- Extended to: MSIX
- Open format?: Yes

APPX is a file format used to distribute and install apps on Windows 8.x, 10, 11, Windows Phone 8.1, Windows 10 Mobile, Xbox One, Xbox Series X|S, HoloLens, and Windows 10 IoT Core. APPX was originally the only installation system allowed for UWP apps, replacing the XAP file format on Windows Phone 8.1, in an attempt to unify the distribution of apps for Windows Phone and Windows 8. APPX files are only compatible with Windows Phone 8.1 and later versions, and with Windows 8 and later versions.

The Windows Phone 8.x Marketplace allowed users to download APPX files to an SD card and install them manually. In contrast, sideloading of UWP apps was prohibited on Windows 8.x, unless the user had a developers license or was in a business domain.

=== MSIX ===
MSIX
- Filename extension: .msix, .msixbundle
- Developed by: Microsoft
- Type of format: Archive
- Container for: Installation information, EXE files, DLL files, and/or other bundled content ("assets")
- Contained by: ZIP, OPC
- Extended from: App-V, APPX, MSI
- Open format?: Yes

Windows 10 version 1709 and Windows Server 2019 LTSC introduced a new installation package format called MSIX, which is intended to be a replacement for both the APPX format and the Windows Installer (.msi) desktop application installation format. MSIX is now the preferred way of distributing UWP apps. An open source project called MSIX Core was started to provide MSIX support for Windows versions earlier than Windows 10 version 1709.

== Security ==
Traditional Windows applications generally have the power to use and change their ecosystem however they want to. Windows user account rights, User Account Control and antivirus software attempt to keep this ability in check and notify the user when the app tries to use it, possibly for malicious purposes. UWP apps, however, are sandboxed and cannot permanently change a Windows ecosystem. They need permission to access hardware devices such as webcams, microphones or their file system which is restricted to user folders, such as My Documents. Microsoft further moderates these programs and may remove them from the Windows Store if they are discovered to have security or privacy issues.

== See also ==
- Windows App Studio
- WinJS
