= Microsoft Expression Design =

Vector and raster graphics editor

- Screenshot of Expression Design 4
- Developer(s): Microsoft
- Initial release: August 30, 2007; 17 years ago
- Final release: 4 (8.0.31217.1) / December 20, 2012; 12 years ago
- Operating system: Windows XP, Windows Vista, Windows 7, Windows 8
- Platform: IA-32; .NET Framework, Silverlight, DirectX
- Type: Vector graphics editor
- License: Freeware
- Website: microsoft.com/expression/

Microsoft Expression Design was Microsoft's commercial professional illustration vector and raster graphic design tool for web images based on Creature House Expression, which was acquired by Microsoft in 2003. It is available free of charge from Microsoft and is a component of the discontinued Microsoft Expression Studio suite. Expression Design is more oriented towards editing XAML and web graphics rather than print graphics (like Photoshop and Illustrator) and does not incorporate all of the raster image editing features of the original Creature House Expression.

== History ==
Expression Design was codenamed Acrylic Graphic Designer during Microsoft Professional Developer Conference 2005 as part of Microsoft Expression professional tools for Windows Vista, and was originally announced as Expression Graphic Designer until the current name was adopted in December 2006.

The first version of Expression Design was released to manufacturing along with other Expression products on 30 April 2007. The RTM news was announced at Microsoft's MIX 07 conference for web developers and designers. Service Pack 1 for Expression Design was released on October 17, 2007.

Expression Design requires the .NET Framework 3.0 as it uses Windows Presentation Foundation. Expression Design is not available as an individual product, but rather only as part of the Expression Studio suite. Originally Expression Studio was not included in any MSDN subscription, but in 2007 Microsoft added it to the highest level MSDN Subscription. Version 2 was released in May 2008 as part of Expression Studio 2.

Expression Design is available for Microsoft Windows XP, Windows Vista, Windows 7, Windows 8, and remains compatible with Windows 8.1 and Windows 10 as of 2019.

A trial version of Expression Design is available. A free copy of Expression Studio 4 (as well as older versions) is available as part of Microsoft's DreamSpark campaign to eligible students.

Expression Design 4, released as part of Expression Studio 4 added the ability to import Windows Metafile (WMF), Enhanced Metafile (EMF), and Enhanced Metafile Plus (EMF+) files into your Expression Design project.

As of December, 2012, Microsoft has announced that Expression Studio will no longer be a stand-alone product. Expression Blend is being integrated into Visual Studio, while Expression Web and Expression Design will now be free products. Technical support is available for customers who purchased Web or Design following their published support lifetime guides, while no support will be offered to free downloaders. No new versions of Expression Web or Design are planned.

== See also ==
- Creature House Expression
- Comparison of vector graphics editors
- Comparison of office suites
