= JiBX =

- Stable release: 1.2.6 / January 1, 2015; 11 years ago
- Written in: Java
- Operating system: Cross-platform
- Size: 20.9 MB (archived)
- Available in: BSD License
- Type: XML binding
- Website: jibx.sourceforge.net

JiBX is an open-source Java framework for XML data binding. It solves the same problem as tools such as JAXB, XMLBeans and JDOM, but uses an alternate approach. It lets developers work with data from XML documents using arbitrarily defined Plain Old Java Objects (POJOs). The JiBX framework uses a binding definition to tell it how the Java objects map to the XML and vice versa. It is designed to perform the translation between internal data structures and XML with very high efficiency, and has been claimed to be the fastest XML data binding framework for Java.

JiBX differs from other Java-XML transformation tools such as JAXB, XMLBeans and JDOM in that it is not based on code generation but on "Mapped Data Binding". In other words, the Java class and the XML document being mapped are both treated as first class objects and one is not generated from the other. This approach decouples the domain model (Java) from the service interface (input and output XML documents) in a way that is consistent with the goals of Service-Oriented Architecture (SOA).

Like traditional Java-XML tools, the JiBX framework can produce a set of Java classes but unlike most other XML binding tools for Java, JiBX does not require this step. It can generate byte code enhancements for existing classes from an XML-Java binding declaration.
