= Microsoft Expression Web =

Discontinued HTML editor by Microsoft

- Expression Web 4 running on Windows 8
- Developer: Microsoft
- Release: December 4, 2006; 19 years ago
- Final release: 4 (4.0.1460.0) / December 20, 2012; 13 years ago
- Operating system: Microsoft Windows
- Platform: IA-32; DirectX, .NET Framework 4.0, Silverlight v4
- Available in: English, Chinese (Simplified), Chinese (Traditional), French, German, Italian, Japanese, Korean, Spanish
- Type: HTML editor
- License: Freeware

Microsoft Expression Web is a discontinued HTML editor and general web design software product by Microsoft. It grew out of Microsoft FrontPage and was discontinued on December 20, 2012, and subsequently made available free of charge from Microsoft. It was a component of the also discontinued Expression Studio.

Expression Web can design and develop web pages using HTML5, CSS 3, ASP.NET, PHP, JavaScript, XML+XSLT and XHTML. Expression Web 4 requires .NET Framework 4.0 and Silverlight 4.0 to install and run. Expression Web uses its own standards-based rendering engine which is different from Internet Explorer's Trident engine.

== Version history ==
Developer	Major version	Release date	Minor updates	Release date	Notes
Microsoft	1.0 (12.0.4518.1014)	December 2006	SP1 (12.0.6211.1000)	December 2007	Included in Microsoft Expression Studio
Microsoft	2.0 (12.0.4518.1084)	May 2008	Update (12.0.6329.5000)	December 2008	Included in Microsoft Expression Studio 2
Microsoft	3.0 (3.0.1762.0)	July 2009	SP1 (3.0.3813.0)	November 2009	Included in Microsoft Expression Studio 3
Microsoft	3.0 (3.0.1762.0)	July 2009	SP2 (3.0.3816.0)	April 2010	Included in Microsoft Expression Studio 3
Microsoft	3.0 (3.0.1762.0)	July 2009	SP3	October 2011	Included in Microsoft Expression Studio 3
Microsoft	4.0 (4.0.1165.0)	July 2010	SP1 (4.0.1241.0)	March 2011	Included in Microsoft Expression Studio 4
Microsoft	4.0 (4.0.1165.0)	July 2010	SP2 (4.0.1303.0)	July 2011	Included in Microsoft Expression Studio 4
Microsoft	4.0 (4.0.1165.0)	July 2010	SP2a (4.0.1460.0)	December 2012	

On May 14, 2006, Microsoft released the first Community Technology Preview (CTP) version of Expression Web, code-named Quartz. On September 5, 2006, Microsoft released Beta 1. Beta 1 removed most of the FrontPage-proprietary (non-standard) features such as bots (use of FPSE features for server-side scripting), parts, functions, themes, automatic generation of navigation buttons, FrontPage forms, navigation pane to build a web site's hierarchy, and other non-standard features available in CTP 1. The Release To Manufacturing version was made available on December 4, 2006. The first and only service pack was published in December 2007. Expression Web does not have the form validation controls for HTML fields like FrontPage, but supports validator controls for ASP.NET.

Microsoft Expression Web 2 was released in 2008. Expression Web 2 offers native support for PHP and Silverlight. No service packs were released for version 2, but in December 2008 it received an update that fixed a problem that prevented macros from running on Windows Vista-based client computers.

Microsoft Expression Web 3 was released in 2009. Until version 2, Expression Web was the only application in the Expression Studio suite based on Microsoft Office code and dependencies. With version 3, Expression Web was rewritten in Windows Presentation Foundation, in line with the rest of the Expression Suite, without Microsoft Office dependencies. A result of this was features like customizable toolbars and menus, standard Windows color scheme, spell check, DLL addins, file menu export feature, drag-and-drop between remote sites, comparing sites by timestamp, automatic language tagging, basic macro support were removed in this version. Other features like Undo do not work reliably. Version 3 introduced Expression Web 3 SuperPreview tool for comparing and rendering webpage in various browsers. Also noted was the lack of support for root relative links, links that start with a "/" to refer to the root of a web server. This feature was added with Expression Web 3 Service Pack 1, released in November 2009. Service Pack 2 for Expression Web 3 was released in April 2010. Service Pack 3 for Expression Web 3 was released in October 2011 and includes general product, stability, performance, and security fixes.

Microsoft Expression Web 4 was released on June 7, 2010. It added the option of HTML add-ins, and access to a web-based SuperPreview functionality, for testing pages on browsers that cannot be installed on the user's system (such as Mac OS X or Linux browsers). Microsoft Expression Web 4 also provides an SEO Checker which analyzes produced web site against the best practices for getting the highest possible search-engine rankings. Version 4 does not bring back all the features removed in Version 3. Expression Web 4 Service Pack 1 was released in March 2011 and added support for IntelliSense for the HTML5 and CSS3 draft specifications in the Code editor, HTML5 and CSS3 support in the CSS Properties palette, selected CSS3 properties in the Style dialogs, semantic HTML5 tags in Design View and new PHP 5.3 functions. Expression Web 4 SP2 was released in July 2011, and fixed a number of issues and introduced new features such as jQuery IntelliSense support, a panel for managing snippets, Interactive Snapshot Panel, comment/uncomment functionality in Code View, and workspace and toolbar customization. Expression Web 4 SP2a, an hotfix released in October 2011, fixes an issue caused by corruption in the license store.

== Availability ==
In December, 2012, Microsoft announced that Expression Studio would no longer be a stand-alone product. Expression Blend is being integrated into Visual Studio, while Expression Web and Expression Design will now be free products. Technical support is available for customers who purchased Expression Web or Expression Design following their published support lifetime guides, while no support will be offered to free downloaders. No new versions of Expression Web or Design are planned.

== Reception ==
Microsoft Expression Web received positive reviews. PC Pro awarded Expression Web 2 five stars out of six. "It largely succeeded by concentrating on providing standards-compliant support for the web's core markup languages, (X)HTML and CSS," Tom Arah concluded.

PC Magazine also rated Expression Web 2 with 4 stars out of 5 and labeled it as a more cost-effective option compared to the main competitor, Adobe Dreamweaver. "Even if money is no object, Expression Web 2 might be your better choice," editor Edward Mendelson wrote. However, PC Magazine criticized a lack of "Secure FTP in its Web-publishing functions" and "the ability to create browser-based (as opposed to server-based) scripting of dynamic pages that works in all browsers, including Safari". On the other hand, PC Magazine noted that "most designers won't care about their absence". However, Microsoft Expression 3 later added support for SSH File Transfer Protocol (SFTP) (otherwise known as Secure FTP) as well as FTP over SSL (FTPS).

Expression Web 4, like the previous versions, also received positive reviews with PC Magazine calling it an "efficient website editor with full support for current standards," and praising its "clear interface" and "flexible preview functions."

== See also ==
- Microsoft Visual Studio
- Microsoft FrontPage
- Comparison of HTML editors
- Comparison of office suites
- List of HTML editors
