= Creature House Expression =

- Screenshot of Creature House Expression 3.3.372
- Original authors: Creature House (up to 3), P&A., Inc. (3J)
- Developers: Creature House, now acquired by Microsoft
- Stable release: 3.3.372 / Nov 2003
- Operating system: Microsoft Windows, Mac OS X
- Type: Vector graphics editor with skeletal stroke capability
- License: Freeware Proprietary EULA
- Website: www.microsoft.com

Creature House Expression was a vector graphics editor developed by Creature House in Hong Kong, founded by Alex S.C. Hsu and Irene H. H. Lee. It was initially marketed through a developer/publisher agreement with Ray Dream Inc. subsequently Fractal Design Corporation and later MetaCreations under the trade name Fractal Design Expression. The software was positioned as a companion to then-Fractal Design/MetaCreations Painter. Creature House regained full marketing rights from MetaCreations Corp. in late 2000 and published version 2 of the software under its own name as Creature House Expression. The latest version of Creature House Expression published by Creature House Ltd is version 3.3.

In Sep 2003, Microsoft acquired the software product together with all related trademarks and titles and hired Dr. Alex S. C. Hsu as an architect. Eventually, Alex S. C. Hsu led a new Microsoft team to continue the development of the software under the code name Acrylic as part of a new Expression Suite Project initiated by Alex S. C. Hsu and others. In 2007, the original Expression application became part of Microsoft's Expression Studio suite of applications, rebranded and rewritten in WPF as Microsoft Expression Design. Windows XP and Vista versions are available, although Mac OS X support was officially discontinued.

== Skeletal stroke ==
Expression uses a unique technology called skeletal stroke. There have been a few research papers on this technology, including the work of Alex S. C. Hsu and Irene H. H. Lee, who are the original developers of Expression.

== LivingCels ==
Along with Expression, Create House also developed animation software called LivingCels, featuring the same technology, including skeletal strokes, as in Expression. LivingCels was released as a public preview, but never made it to final release after Creature House was purchased by Microsoft.

== See also ==
- Microsoft Expression Design, the new product based on Creature House Expression
- List of vector graphics editors
- Comparison of vector graphics editors
