= UI data binding =

UI data binding is a software design pattern to simplify development of GUI applications. UI data binding binds UI elements to an application domain model. Most frameworks employ the Observer pattern as the underlying binding mechanism. To work efficiently, UI data binding has to address input validation and data type mapping.

A bound control is a widget whose value is tied or bound to a field in a recordset (e.g., a column in a row of a table). Changes made to data within the control are automatically saved to the database when the control's exit event triggers.

== Example ==
<TextBlock Text="{Binding Username}" />

public class ExampleViewModel
{
    public string Username { get; set; }
}

== Data binding frameworks and tools ==
=== Delphi ===
- DSharp third-party data binding tool
- OpenWire Visual Live Binding - third-party visual data binding tool

=== Java ===
- JFace Data Binding
- JavaFX Property

=== .NET ===
- Windows Forms data binding overview
- WPF data binding overview
- Avalonia
- Unity 3D data binding framework (available in modifications for NGUI, iGUI and EZGUI libraries)

=== JavaScript ===
- Angular
- AngularJS
- Backbone.js
- Ember.js
- Datum.js
- knockout.js
- Meteor, via its Blaze live update engine
- OpenUI5
- React
- Vue.js

== See also ==
- Data binding
