= Central Digital TV Chinese Art Channel =

Central Digital TV Chinese Art Channel (Chinese: 中央数字电视书画频道), often abbreviated as Shuhua TV (Chinese: 书画频道), is a Beijing-based television station specialising in arts programmes.

Shuhua broadcasts are available in Beijing (channel 173), Shanghai (channel 131), Guangdong (channel 126), Shenzhen (channel 110), Chongqing (channel 107) and Shandong (channel 133). They are also broadcast live on https://web.archive.org/web/20160130135434/http://www.shtv.net.cn/ using the proprietary Microsoft Silverlight browser extension. There is no catch-up TV service, but some featured programmes are available for longer periods.
