= Pipelight =

Compatibility layer that allows NPAPI plugins designed for Windows to run on Linux

- Repository: bitbucket.org/mmueller2012/pipelight.git
- Written in: C, C++
- Operating system: Linux
- Type: compatibility layer
- License: GNU GPL v2, GNU LGPL v2.1, Mozilla Public License
- Website: launchpad.net/pipelight

Pipelight is a compatibility layer that allows NPAPI plugins designed for Windows to run on Linux. It is based on a modified version of Wine. It currently supports Silverlight, Flash Player, Unity 3D, and Widevine. There is experimental support for additional plugins such as Shockwave Player. Pipelight requires that the browser support NPAPI plugins, which some browsers (notably newer versions of Chrome and Opera) don't support. Firefox dropped NPAPI support in version 52.
