= Scott Guthrie =

American computer programmer

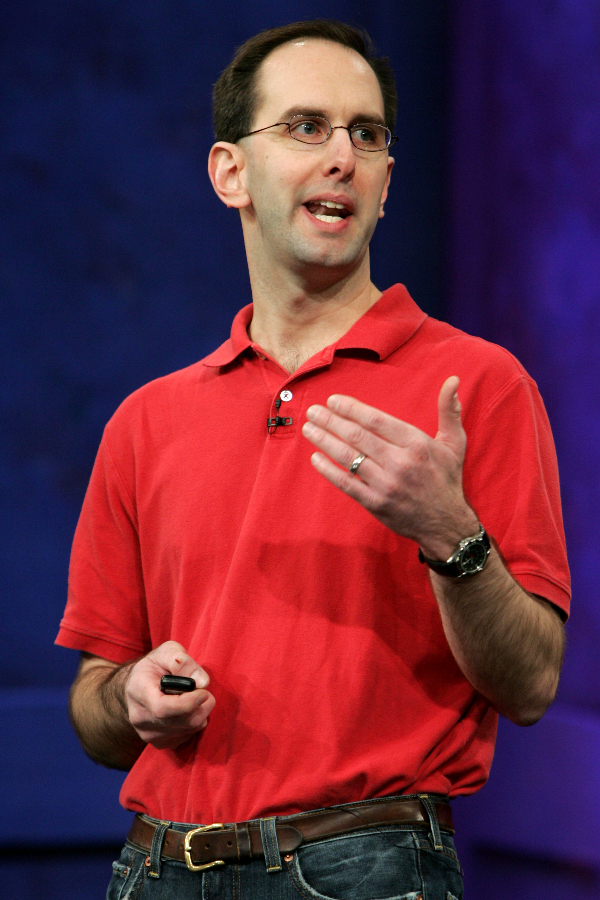
- Guthrie at MIX in 2007
- Born: February 6, 1975 (age 51)
- Education: Duke University
- Occupation: Executive Vice President of Microsoft

Scott Guthrie (born February 6, 1975) is Executive Vice President of the Cloud and AI group in Microsoft.

He leads the teams that develop Microsoft Azure, Dynamics 365, HoloLens, Microsoft SQL Server, Power BI and Power Apps. Previously Guthrie lead Visual Studio, Visual Studio Code, GitHub and .NET.

Guthrie graduated with a degree in computer science from Duke University. Following this, he joined Microsoft in 1997. He frequently presents wearing a signature red shirt and speaks at many of the major Microsoft conferences.

He is also known for his work on ASP.NET, which he and colleague Mark Anders developed while at Microsoft.

== Personal life ==
Guthrie lives in Seattle with his wife and two children.
