= Phase One Media Pro =

Media Pro

- Screenshot of Media Pro 1 running on OS X
- Original author(s): iView Multimedia
- Developer(s): Phase One
- Final release: 2.1.0.161 / August 8, 2016; 8 years ago
- Operating system: Windows XP SP3 or later; OS X 10.7.4 or later
- Size: Windows: 136 MB; OS X: 202 MB
- Type: Image organizer and digital asset management
- License: Shareware

Phase One Media Pro (formerly Microsoft Expression Media and iView Media Pro) was a commercial digital asset management cataloging program for Microsoft Windows and Apple OS X operating systems. It was the next version of iView MediaPro which Microsoft acquired in June 2006, and sold again in May 2010 to Phase One, which also makes the Capture One raw converter software. The software was aimed at professionals and photo enthusiasts who needed a photo manager which made it easier to manage photo and video assets, especially very large resolution image files and libraries with many items.

== Features ==
Media Pro makes it possible to catalog and sort images and other media files. The user is able to organize and categorize without being limited to assets' actual folder locations, add metadata including IPTC annotations, and locate assets which may spread over multiple folder and drive locations, including offline discs. As well as cataloging, Media Pro can print (into formats like contact sheets and lists), build web galleries, convert to other formats and build slideshows.

=== Supported formats ===
Media Pro supports photo and video files from more than 100 different cameras and is built to manage large photo libraries (especially very large raw, tiff and jpeg files). It is also capable of handling audio, DTP, font, text and HTML files.

Although Media Pro is primarily used to catalog photographic images, it is capable of indexing and converting many additional classes of files. This includes the most popular formats of audio and video files, which can be organized, played in the catalog itself, and converted to derivative file types. This capability makes Media Pro useful for photographers and other media professionals who need to create, manage and make use of different media types.

== History and releases ==
Microsoft Expression Media 2, the predecessor of Media Pro

The original predecessor of Phase One Media Pro is iView, a Macintosh-only shareware gallery application originally from Script Software, a company that later changed its name to Plum Amazing. iView went through multiple updates and name changes, being ported to Microsoft Windows, and culminating in a version 3.0 release as iView MediaPro. On 27 June 2007, Microsoft acquired iView Multimedia. Eventually, Microsoft released Microsoft Expression Media, which replaced iView MediaPro 3.

Microsoft Expression Media was released to manufacturing along with other Expression products on 30 April 2007. The RTM news was announced at Microsoft's MIX 07 conference for web developers and designers. In September 2007, Microsoft released Expression Media Service Pack 1 for Windows and OS X which adds support for HD Photo. Expression Media 2 was released in May 2008 as part of Expression Studio 2. Expression Media 2 Service Pack 1 was released in October 2008. The latest version is Expression Media 2 Service Pack 2, which requires SP1 to be installed.

Expression Media, however, did not last. On 23 July 2009, Expression Studio 3 was released, but left out Expression Media.

On 25 May 2010, Phase One acquired Expression Media from Microsoft and changed the name. Media Pro was released in September 2011 and features support for larger catalogs, compatibility between Media Pro and Capture One, an updated user interface, support for XMP sidecar files and latest camera formats for photo and video files.

As of August 30th, 2018, Phase One has stopped selling Media Pro and has discontinued the software. Phase One recommends migrating Media Pro catalogs into Capture One.
