= Recordset =

A recordset is a data structure that consists of a group of database records, and can either come from a base table or as the result of a query to the table.

The concept is common to a number of platforms, notably Microsoft's Data Access Objects (DAO) and ActiveX Data Objects (ADO). The Recordset object contains a Fields collection, and a Properties collection. At any time, the Recordset object refers to only a single record within the set as the current record.

== See also ==
- Bound control
