= Microsoft Blend =

User interface design tool by Microsoft

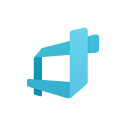

- Blend for Visual Studio 2012 screenshot
- Developer: Microsoft
- Stable release: 2022 v17.13.5 / March 25, 2025; 14 months ago
- Operating system: Windows 7 and later
- Platform: DirectX
- License: Same as Visual Studio
- Website: visualstudio.microsoft.com

Microsoft Blend for Visual Studio (formerly Microsoft Expression Blend) is a user interface design tool developed and sold by Microsoft for creating graphical interfaces for web and desktop applications that blend the features of these two types of applications. It is an interactive, WYSIWYG front-end for designing XAML-based interfaces for Windows Presentation Foundation, Silverlight and UWP applications. It was one of the applications in the Microsoft Expression Studio suite before that suite was discontinued.

Expression Blend supports the WPF text engine with advanced OpenType typography and ClearType, vector-based 2D widgets, and 3D widgets with hardware acceleration via DirectX.

== History ==
Expression Blend was code-named Sparkle, and originally the product was announced as Microsoft Expression Interactive Designer, before it was renamed Expression Blend in December 2006.

On January 24, 2007, Microsoft released the first public Community Technology Preview of Expression Blend as a free download on their web site. The final version was released to manufacturing along with other Expression products on April 30, 2007. The RTM news was announced at Microsoft's MIX 07 conference for web developers and designers. Expression Blend Service Pack 1 was released in November 2007. Expression Blend requires .NET Framework 3.0. Expression Blend and Expression Web are also available as part of the MSDN Premium subscription.

In December 2012, Microsoft announced that they were discontinuing the standalone Expression suite tools. Expression Blend was integrated into Visual Studio 2012 and Visual Studio Express for Windows 8.

=== Release history ===
Release	Release date	Highlights
2	2008-04-28	Support developing Microsoft Silverlight browser-based rich web applications providing animation, vector graphics, interactivity and video playback capabilities. Version 2.0 supported only Silverlight 1.0 applications at release and Microsoft had planned Blend 2.5 for Silverlight 2.0 applications, however the capabilities of the preview version 2.5 have been added to Blend 2.0 Service Pack 1.
3	2009-07-22	Support for PSD and AI files, SketchFlow, TFS support and number of other significant improvements. Sketchflow is a user experience prototyping module implemented in Blend.
4	2010-06-07	Support for Silverlight 4 and WPF 4 while also remaining compatible with Silverlight 3 and WPF 3.5 SP1 applications. Other improvements and additions: shapes library, improved Photoshop file support, added pixel shader effects, path layout, transition effects, ListBox item transitions, model–view–viewmodel (MVVM) pattern support, additional Behaviors, conditional Behaviors, sample data from CLR classes, design time resource resolution, easing functions for WPF 4, cleaner XAML, and .ZIP support for projects and templates. Support for Windows Phone 7 projects to Expression Blend 4 Release Candidate.
2012	2012-08-15	Name changed to "Blend for Visual Studio 2012". Released alongside the Windows 8 & Visual Studio 2012 RTMs. Includes support for WPF version 3.5, 4.0 and 4.5, Silverlight 4.0 and 5.0, SketchFlow, and Blend tools for Windows 8.
2013	2013-10-17	Released alongside Visual Studio 2013 RTMs
2015	2015-07-20	Released alongside Visual Studio 2015 RTMs
2017	2017-03-07	Released alongside Visual Studio 2017 RTMs
2019	2019-04-02	Released alongside Visual Studio 2019 RTMs
2022	2022-04-19	Released alongside Visual Studio 2022 RTMs

== See also ==
- Glade Interface Designer
- Interface Builder
