= Jakarta XML Binding =

Java EE software framework

- Written in: Java
- Website: projects.eclipse.org/projects/ee4j.jaxb-impl
- Repository: github.com/eclipse-ee4j/jaxb-ri

Jakarta XML Binding (JAXB; formerly Java Architecture for XML Binding) is a software framework that allows Java EE developers to map Java classes to XML representations. JAXB provides two main features: the ability to marshal Java objects into XML and the inverse, i.e. to unmarshal XML back into Java objects. In other words, JAXB allows storing and retrieving data in memory in any XML format, without the need to implement a specific set of XML loading and saving routines for the program's class structure. It is similar to xsd.exe and XmlSerializer in the .NET Framework.

JAXB is particularly useful when the specification is complex and changing. In such a case, regularly changing the XML Schema definitions to keep them synchronised with the Java definitions can be time-consuming and error-prone.

JAXB is one of the APIs in the Jakarta EE platform (formerly Java EE), part of the Java Web Services Development Pack (JWSDP), and one of the foundations for WSIT. It was also part of the Java SE platform (in version Java SE 6–10). As of Java SE 11, JAXB was removed. For details, see JEP 320.

JAXB 1.0 was released in 2003, having been developed under the Java Community Process as JSR 31. In 2006 JAXB 2.0 was released under JSR 222 and Maintenance Release 2 released in December 2009. Reference implementations for these specifications were available under the CDDL open source license at java.net.

== Usage ==
The tool "xjc" can be used to convert XML Schema and other schema file types (as of Java 1.6, RELAX NG, XML DTD, and WSDL are supported experimentally) to class representations. Classes are marked up using annotations from javax.xml.bind.annotation.* namespace, for example, @XmlRootElement and @XmlElement. XML list sequences are represented by attributes of type java.util.List. Marshallers and Unmarshallers are created through an instance of JAXBContext.

In addition, JAXB includes a "schemagen" tool that can essentially perform the inverse of "xjc", creating an XML Schema from a set of annotated classes.

== Default data type bindings ==
The table below lists the mappings of XML Schema (XSD) data types to Java data types in JAXB.

XML Schema Type	Java Data Type
xsd:string	java.lang.String
xsd:integer	java.math.BigInteger
xsd:positiveInteger	java.math.BigInteger
xsd:int	int
xsd:long	long
xsd:short	short
xsd:decimal	java.math.BigDecimal
xsd:float	float
xsd:double	double
xsd:boolean	boolean
xsd:byte	byte
xsd:QName	javax.xml.namespace.QName
xsd:dateTime	javax.xml.datatype.XMLGregorianCalendar
xsd:base64Binary	byte[]
xsd:hexBinary	byte[]
xsd:unsignedInt	long
xsd:unsignedShort	int
xsd:unsignedByte	short
xsd:unsignedLong	java.math.BigDecimal
xsd:time	javax.xml.datatype.XMLGregorianCalendar
xsd:date	javax.xml.datatype.XMLGregorianCalendar
xsd:g	javax.xml.datatype.XMLGregorianCalendar
xsd:anySimpleType	java.lang.Object
xsd:anySimpleType	java.lang.String
xsd:duration	javax.xml.datatype.Duration
xsd:NOTATION	javax.xml.namespace.QName

== Versions ==
- Java SE 9: JAXB 2.3.0 (in module java.xml.bind; this module is marked as deprecated)
- Java SE 8: JAXB 2.2.8
- Java SE 7: JAXB 2.2.3 (JSR 222, maintenance release 2)
- Java SE 6: JAXB 2.0 (JSR 222)

== See also ==
- XML data binding
- JiBX
- XMLBeans – a similar and complementary technology to JAXB from Apache Software Foundation
- TopLink – an object to relational and object to XML mapper from Oracle that supports JAXB 1.0
- EclipseLink MOXy – open source implementation of JAXB and object XML mapping services under the Eclipse Foundation
