= Adam Nathan =

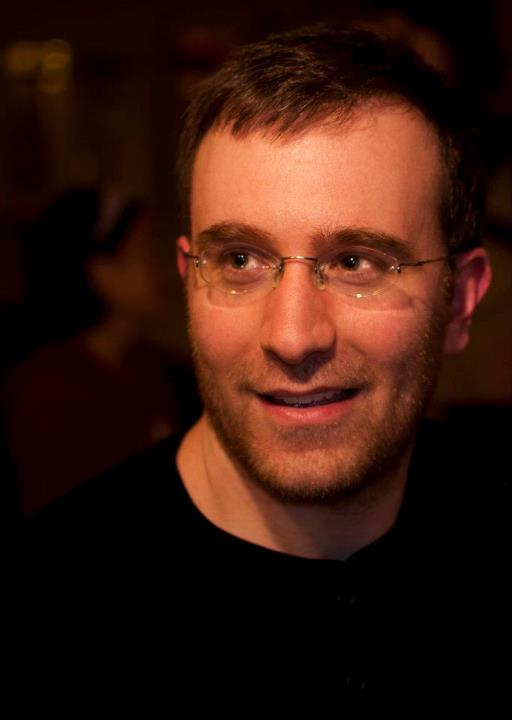
Nathan at an event in 2011

Adam Nathan is a technical author/speaker, and currently works as a software architect at Google. Adam was the core architect of Microsoft Popfly. He has been involved with .NET technologies from the beginning, and has written a 1,600-page book on .NET/COM Interoperability. He also created the PINVOKE.NET wiki, which helps .NET developers use unmanaged APIs.

== Books ==
- Windows 8 Apps with XAML and C# Unleashed
- 101 Windows Phone 7 Apps: Volume 1: Developing Apps 1-50
- 101 Windows Phone 7 Apps: Volume 2: Developing Apps 51-101
- WPF 4 Unleashed
- WPF 4.5 Unleashed
- Silverlight 1.0 Unleashed
- WPF Unleashed
- .NET and COM: The Complete Interoperability Guide
- ASP.NET: Tips, Tutorials, and Code
- XAML Unleashed

== Interviews ==
- Safari Books Online - Author Interview with Adam Nathan
- Interview from Canadian Information Processing Society (CIPS)
- Adam Nathan - Light up an app with WPF (on Channel 9)
- Adam Nathan and John Montgomery: Popfly - Now Open to the General Public and New Features Announced (on Channel 9)
- Adam Nathan: and Suzanne Hansen: First Look at Popfly Game Creator Alpha (on Channel 9)
