= Avalonia (software framework) =

Software framework

- Developers: .NET Foundation and AvaloniaUI OÜ
- Release: December 5, 2013; 12 years ago
- Stable release: 12.1.4 / 9 October 2026
- Written in: C#
- Operating system: Windows, Linux, macOS, iOS, Android
- Type: Software framework
- License: MIT License
- Website: https://avaloniaui.net/
- Repository: github.com/AvaloniaUI/Avalonia

Avalonia is a free and open-source .NET cross-platform XAML-based UI framework inspired by WPF/UWP and distributed under the MIT License. Avalonia supports the MVVM pattern.

It enables development of cross-platform applications using any .NET language, including C#, F# and VB.NET for Windows, Linux, macOS, iOS, Android and WebAssembly.

Avalonia supports multiple renderers, including Direct2D and Skia Graphics Engine, allowing it to operate on a broad range of platforms. Avalonia draws its entire UI, mirroring the approach taken by Flutter.

== History ==
Avalonia, originally named Perspex, was first developed by Steven Kirk, with its initial commit made on 5 December 2013. The framework was conceived with the aim of creating a cross-platform UI framework, inspired by Windows Presentation Foundation (WPF).

Avalonia became part of the .NET Foundation on 1 April 2020, and left on 20 February 2024.

On 24 June 2025, Avalonia announced a $3 million sponsorship from Devolutions to support the continued development of the framework while maintaining its free and open-source nature.

== IDE support ==
Avalonia maintains supports for the following IDEs and editors via plugins:

- Visual Studio Code
- Visual Studio

Other IDEs can be used with community-supported plugins, including JetBrains Rider.

== See also ==
- List of open-source application frameworks
