= Microsoft Silverlight =

Application framework for rich Internet applications

- Developer: Microsoft Corporation
- Release: September 5, 2007; 19 years ago
- Final release: 5.1.50918.0 (January 15, 2019; 7 years ago) [±]
- Preview release: None [±]
- Operating system: Microsoft Windows, Windows Mobile, Windows Phone 7, Mac OS X, and Symbian OS
- Platform: ARM32, IA-32 and x86-64
- Type: Application framework, run-time environment and multimedia framework
- License: Freeware
- Website: microsoft.com/silverlight

Microsoft Silverlight is a discontinued application framework designed for writing and running rich Internet applications, similar to Adobe's runtime, Adobe Flash. While early versions of Silverlight focused on streaming media, later versions supported multimedia, graphics, and animation, and gave support to developers for CLI languages and development tools. Silverlight was one of the two application development platforms for Windows Phone, but web pages using Silverlight did not run on the Windows Phone or Windows Mobile versions of Internet Explorer, as there was no Silverlight plugin for Internet Explorer on those platforms.

Microsoft terminated support for Silverlight on Internet Explorer 11 (the last remaining web browser still supporting Silverlight) on October 12, 2021.

== History ==
=== Introduction ===
From the initial launch in 2007, reviewers compared the product to Adobe's Flash.

=== Adoption ===
According to statowl.com, Microsoft Silverlight had a penetration of 64.2% in May 2011. Usage in July 2010 was 53.6%, whereas as of May 2011 market leader Adobe Flash was installed on 95.3% of browsers, and Java was supported on 76.5% of browsers. Support of these plugins is not mutually exclusive; one system can support all three.

Silverlight was used to provide video streaming for the NBC coverage of the 2008 Summer Olympics in Beijing, the 2010 Winter Olympics in Vancouver, and the 2008 conventions for both major United States political parties. Silverlight was also used by Amazon Video and Netflix for their instant video streaming services, but Netflix said in its Tech Blog in 2013 that, since Microsoft had announced Silverlight's end-of-life, they would be moving to HTML video.

=== Demise ===
Industry observers announced the death of Silverlight as early as 2011, although speculation in late 2010 was shut down. In 2012, Microsoft deprecated Silverlight for HTML5 in Windows 8, but until 2015 it was not clear what Microsoft's official position was on Silverlight's future. In July 2015, a Microsoft blog post clarified that, "… we encourage companies that are using Silverlight for media to begin the transition to DASH/MSE/CENC/EME based designs".

Microsoft planned to terminate Silverlight support on October 12, 2021. Support for IE7–8 was removed between 2014 and 2016, depending on the OS. Support for IE9 and IE10 has also ended "or though [sic] the support lifecycle of the underlying browsers, whichever is shorter." There is no Silverlight plugin available for Microsoft Edge [Legacy] or newer. It has not been supported by Google Chrome since September 2015 or by Firefox since March 2017.

Since late 2023, less than 0.02% of sites used Silverlight, less than 1.3% used the also discontinued Adobe Flash Player, and less than 0.03% use Java client-side (while less than 4.7% use Java server-side).

Netflix continued to support Silverlight playback for browsers that did not support HTML 5 playback or Widevine until September 13, 2023. Amazon Prime Video similarly stopped supporting Silverlight playback for older browsers some time after Silverlight's end of support date with it being reported as working in August 2021 but not as of 2024. Unlike Netflix however, Amazon did not mention ending Silverlight support.

== Overview ==
Silverlight provides a retained mode graphics system similar to Windows Presentation Foundation (WPF), and integrates multimedia, graphics, animations, and interactivity into a single run-time environment. In Silverlight applications, user interfaces are declared in Extensible Application Markup Language (XAML) and programmed using a subset of the .NET Framework. XAML can be used for marking up the vector graphics and animations. Silverlight can also be used to create Windows Sidebar gadgets for Windows Vista.

Silverlight supports H.264 video, Advanced Audio Coding, Windows Media Video (WMV), Windows Media Audio (WMA), and MPEG Layer III (MP3) media content across all supported browsers without requiring Windows Media Player, the Windows Media Player ActiveX control, or Windows Media browser plug-ins. Because Windows Media Video 9 is an implementation of the Society of Motion Picture and Television Engineers (SMPTE) VC-1 standard, Silverlight also supports VC-1 video. According to the end user license agreement VC-1 and H.264 are only licensed for the "personal and non-commercial use of a consumer". Silverlight makes it possible to dynamically load Extensible Markup Language (XML) content that can be manipulated through a Document Object Model (DOM) interface, a technique that is consistent with conventional Ajax techniques. Silverlight exposes a Downloader object which can be used to download content, like scripts, media assets, or other data, as may be required by the application. With version 2, the programming logic can be written in any .NET language, including some nuclear evolution of common dynamic programming languages like IronRuby and IronPython.

A free software implementation (now abandoned) named Moonlight, developed by Novell in cooperation with Microsoft, was released to bring Silverlight version 1 and 2 functionality to Linux, FreeBSD, and other open source platforms, although some Linux distributions did not include it, citing redistribution and patent concerns. However, in May 2012, Moonlight was abandoned because of its lack of popularity.

== Supported platforms ==
Over the course of about five years, Microsoft had released five versions with varying platform support: the first version was released in 2007, and the fifth (and final) major version on May 8, 2012. It is compatible with later versions of Internet Explorer web browser on Microsoft Windows (except Windows RT) operating systems, with Safari on Apple macOS, and with mobile devices using the Windows Mobile and Symbian (Series 60) platforms.

Cross-platform Mozilla Firefox support for Silverlight was removed in Firefox 52 released in March 2017 when Mozilla removed support for NPAPI plugins, bringing it in-line with the removal of NPAPI plugin support in Google Chrome.

=== Desktop computers ===
Silverlight requires an x86 processor with Streaming SIMD Extensions (SSE) support. Supported processors include the Intel Pentium III and up, the AMD Athlon XP and up, and newer AMD Durons.

The following table presents an availability and compatibility matrix of Silverlight versions for various operating systems and web browsers.

Color-coding guide for the following table
Silverlight no longer supported
Silverlight never supported
Not applicable

Supported Silverlight versions by desktop platform
Web browser	Internet Explorer 6 SP1 or later	Internet Explorer 7	Internet Explorer 8 and 9	Internet Explorer 10	Internet Explorer 11	Firefox	Safari	Chrome	Edge	Opera
Windows 11	—N/a	—N/a	—N/a	—N/a	—N/a	None, since Firefox 52	1, 2	None, since Chrome 45	None	None
Windows 10	—N/a	—N/a	—N/a	—N/a	5	None, since Firefox 52	1, 2	None, since Chrome 45	None	None
Windows 8.1 Windows Server 2012 or later	—N/a	—N/a	—N/a	—N/a	5	None, since Firefox 52	1, 2	None, since Chrome 45	None	None
Windows 8	—N/a	—N/a	—N/a	5	—N/a	None, since Firefox 52	1, 2	None, since Chrome 45	None	None
Windows 7 Windows Server 2008 R2	—N/a	—N/a	1, 2, 3, 4, 5	5	5	None, since Firefox 52	1, 2	None, since Chrome 45	None	None
Windows Vista Windows Server 2008	—N/a	1, 2, 3, 4, 5	1, 2, 3, 4, 5	—N/a	—N/a	1, 2, 3, 4, 5 (Note: Firefox 52 ESR is the last version supported on Windows XP and Vista. In contrast to normal Firefox 52, Silverlight is still supported in Firefox 52 ESR.)	1, 2	None, since Chrome 45	—N/a	None
Windows XP Windows Server 2003	1, 2, 3, 4	1, 2, 3, 4, 5	1, 2, 3, 4, 5	—N/a	—N/a	1, 2, 3, 4, 5	1, 2	None, since Chrome 45	—N/a	None
Windows 2000 (KB891861 required)	2, 3, 4	—N/a	—N/a	—N/a	—N/a	None	2	—N/a	—N/a	None
macOS (Intel)	—N/a	—N/a	—N/a	—N/a	—N/a	None, since Firefox 52	None, since Safari 12	None, since Chrome 45	None	None
Ubuntu Linux	—N/a	—N/a	—N/a	—N/a	—N/a	None, since Firefox 52	—N/a	None, since Chrome 45	None	None

Support for Opera had been promised since May 3, 2007, when David Storey, the Chief Web Opener at Opera, revealed a Microsoft poster for MIX conference that had shown Opera integration as a part of Silverlight 1.1. However, Opera was never officially supported by Silverlight.

On Linux and FreeBSD, the functionality was available via Moonlight and Pipelight, though both projects have since been discontinued. Moonlight is available for the major Linux distributions, with support for Firefox, Konqueror, and Opera browsers, provided it was obtained through Novell. Miguel de Icaza has expressed an interest in working with developers from other operating systems (BSD, Solaris) and other browsers (Konqueror, WebKit and Opera) to ensure that Moonlight works fine on their systems. Availability of Moonlight version 1.0 for FreeBSD was announced in March 2009, but has since been reported not to actually work. As of 2011, the current version of Moonlight (4 Preview 1) does not officially work on new versions of Firefox (newer than 3.x) on Linux-based operating systems. However, it can be installed in an unofficial way (for example using the Add-on Compatibility Reporter add-on) and with Firefox 11 it works correctly when installed. As noted above, the Moonlight project was abandoned in May 2012.

A browser plugin named Pipelight used to provide Silverlight access. Pipelight requires browser support for NPAPI plugins, which newer versions of Firefox, Chrome, and Opera have dropped. As of 2018, the Pipelight project has been discontinued.

=== Mobile devices ===
Silverlight was not available on Android or iOS, the most prevalent operating systems on the mobile market.

Silverlight was the primary development environment for Windows Phone (that is by now discontinued) and is based on Silverlight 4. For previous versions of Windows Mobile, the first Community Technology Preview (CTP) for Windows Mobile 6 was expected in the second quarter of 2008, but it still has not been officially announced. Microsoft has stopped focusing on bringing Silverlight to Windows Mobile 6.x. Nokia announced plans to make Silverlight for Mobile available for S60 on Symbian OS, as well as for Series 40 devices and Nokia Internet tablets (while it later sold the business to Microsoft and now sells Android tablets and will sell Alcatel-Lucent branded smartphones). Silverlight for Mobile supports Silverlight 2 content and .NET languages. Silverlight for Windows Phone 7.5 is based on Silverlight 4.

== Development tools ==
A Silverlight application being edited in Microsoft Visual Studio

Silverlight applications could be written in any .NET programming language. As such, any development tools which can be used with .NET languages can work with Silverlight, provided they can target the Silverlight CoreCLR for hosting the application, instead of the .NET Framework CLR. Microsoft has positioned Microsoft Expression Blend as a companion tool to Visual Studio for the design of Silverlight User Interface applications. Visual Studio can be used to develop and debug Silverlight applications. To create Silverlight projects and let the compiler target CoreCLR, Visual Studio requires the Silverlight Tools for Visual Studio.

A Silverlight control is a ZIP format file with extension .XAP containing a list of one or more .NET managed assemblies (.DLL files) along with the AppManifest.XAML file containing this list along with the entry point (class and assembly). It can be hosted in any HTML file using an object tag, for example:

<object data="data:application/x-silverlight-2," type="application/x-silverlight-2" width="100%" height="100%">
  <param name="source" value="MySilverLightControl.xap"/>
</object>

A Silverlight project contains the Silverlight.js and CreateSilverlight.js files which initializes the Silverlight plug-in for use in HTML pages, a XAML file for the UI, and code-behind files for the application code. Silverlight applications are debugged in a manner similar to ASP.NET applications. Visual Studio's CLR Remote Cross Platform Debugging feature can be used to debug Silverlight applications running on a different platform as well.

In conjunction with the release of Silverlight 2, Eclipse was added as a development tool option.

== Licensing ==
An April 2007 PC World report, suggested that Microsoft intended to release certain parts of Silverlight source code as open source software, but a week later Sam Ramji, director of platform technology strategy at Microsoft, contradicted the rumors by confirming that the company had no plans to open Silverlight. Some controls that ship with Silverlight are available under the Microsoft Public License as a part of a separate project known as the Silverlight Toolkit.

At introduction, Silverlight's proprietary nature was a concern to competition due to its potential harm to the open nature of the World Wide Web. Advocates of free software were also concerned Silverlight could be another example of Microsoft's embrace, extend, and extinguish strategy. Both Microsoft Silverlight and Adobe Flash are proprietary. Flash's file formats are publicly documented standards, as are Silverlight's. Silverlight, like other web technologies, uses patent-encumbered audio and video codecs.

== Mono Moonlight implementation ==
The Mono Team abandoned development of Moonlight, a free and open-source implementation of both the Silverlight 1 and 2 runtimes. Development was discontinued in 2012 due to the poor acceptance of Silverlight and the restrictions imposed by Microsoft.

The project had been officially supported by Microsoft which, under an agreement with Novell, made not-publicly-available additional specifications, access to the Silverlight Base Class Library APIs, binary codecs and test cases available to the Mono team.

The "covenant" under which Novell was granted this exclusive access also specified conditions incompatible with the licensing that covers most free and open source software. As examples, it specifically required that the software must have been "obtained directly from Novell or through an Intermediate Recipient" and that it must be "not licensed under GPLv3 or a Similar License". Some free software proponents criticized the covenant.

Silverlight was criticized for not living up to its cross-platform operating system compatibility promises, especially on Linux systems, compared to its extensive support on Apple and Microsoft desktops for Internet Explorer, Firefox, and Chrome. Although Microsoft was officially collaborating on the Moonlight project, Bruce Chizen, CEO of Adobe Systems, which sells the competing proprietary Flash platform, questioned "the commitment of Microsoft to keep the Silverlight platform compatible with other OS besides Windows". His concerns are based on "examples from history" where he said that Microsoft had launched products with promises of ongoing cross-platform compatibility that no longer apply, for example Internet Explorer for UNIX and Windows Media Player for Mac.

== Relationship to existing web standards ==
In 2007, California and several other U.S. states asked a district judge to extend most of Microsoft's antitrust case settlement for another five years, citing "a number of concerns, including the fear that Microsoft could use the next version of Windows to 'tilt the playing field' toward Silverlight, its new Adobe Flash competitor," says a Seattle Post-Intelligencer article. The final judgment on the motion extended the settlement two years, to November 2009, but for reasons unrelated to Silverlight.

== Version history ==
- Silverlight 1 – Silverlight 1, developed under the codename Windows Presentation Foundation/Everywhere (WPF/E) was released in 2007. It consisted of the core presentation framework, which is responsible for the user interface (UI), interactivity and user input, basic UI controls, graphics and animation, media playback, Digital rights management (DRM), and DOM integration.
- Silverlight 2 – Included a version of the .NET Framework and implemented the same full Common Language Runtime (CLR) version as .NET Framework 3.0, so it can execute programs written in any .NET language.
- Silverlight 3 – Silverlight 3 was announced on September 12, 2008, and unveiled at MIX09 in Las Vegas on March 18, 2009. A beta version was made available for download the same day. The final version was released July 9, 2009. Silverlight 3 included more controls—including DataGrid, TreeView, various layout panels, DataForm for forms-driven applications and DataPager for viewing paginated data.
- Silverlight 4 – On November 18, 2009, at the Professional Developers Conference in Los Angeles, Microsoft Corporation unveiled a Beta version of Silverlight 4. The final version was released on April 15, 2010 (along with Silverlight 4 tools for developers). New features in Silverlight 4 include: support for Google's Chrome browser, webcam and microphone, printing, more mouse support, new notification support to send messages to users, new and enhanced controls (e.g., RichTextBox, DataGrid), theming of controls, rendering HTML, better localization, etc.
- Silverlight 5 – The final version was made available to download on December 9, 2011. New features included GPU-accelerated video decoding, 3D graphics, playback speed controls, remote control, and 64-bit support.

== See also ==
- Adobe Flash
- Adobe Flash Player
- Adobe AIR
- Microsoft XNA
- XAML Browser Applications (XBAP)
- Java applet
- OpenSilver
