= Windows 8 =

2012 Microsoft operating system version

- Version of the Windows NT operating system

- The default interfaces of Windows 8
- Developer: Microsoft
- Working state: No longer supported
- Source model: Closed-source; Source-available (through Shared Source Initiative)
- Released to manufacturing: August 1, 2012; 14 years ago
- General availability: October 26, 2012; 14 years ago
- Final release: July 2023 update rollup (6.2.9200.24374) / July 11, 2023; 3 years ago
- Marketing target: Consumer and business
- Update method: Windows Update, Windows Server Update Services
- Supported platforms: IA-32, x86-64
- Kernel type: Hybrid
- Userland: Windows API, .NET Framework, WinRT, NTVDM
- License: Trialware, Microsoft Software Assurance, MSDN subscription, DreamSpark
- Preceded by: Windows 7 (2009)
- Succeeded by: Windows 8.1 (2013)
- Official website: Windows 8 (archived at Wayback Machine)

Support status
- All editions (except Windows Embedded 8 Standard and PCs with the Windows 8.1 update installed): Unsupported as of January 12, 2016.; Windows Embedded 8 Standard: Mainstream support ended on July 10, 2018.; Extended support ended on July 11, 2023.

Windows 8 is a major release of the Windows NT operating system developed by Microsoft. It was released to manufacturing on August 1, 2012, made available for download via MSDN and TechNet on August 15, 2012, and generally released for retail on October 26, 2012. Its server counterpart, Windows Server 2012, was released a month earlier on September 4, 2012.

Windows 8 introduced major changes to the operating system's platform and user interface with the intention to improve its user experience on tablets, where Windows competed with mobile operating systems such as Android and iOS. In particular, these changes included a touch-optimized Windows shell and start screen based on Microsoft's Metro design language, integration with online services, the Windows Store, and a new keyboard shortcut for screenshots. Many of these features were adapted from Windows Phone, and the development of Windows 8 closely paralleled that of Windows Phone 8. Windows 8 also added support for USB 3.0, Advanced Format, near-field communication, and cloud computing, as well as a new lock screen with clock and notifications. Additional security features—including built-in antivirus software, integration with Microsoft SmartScreen phishing filtering, and support for Secure Boot on supported devices—were introduced. It was the first Windows version to support ARM architecture under the Windows RT branding.

Windows 8 introduced significantly higher system requirements than typical operating system upgrades, which Microsoft attributed to security considerations. Windows 8 is compatible with CPUs from the Intel Pentium 4 CPU based on the Cedar Mill core and the Athlon 64 based on the Orleans core through Intel Skylake and AMD Carrizo. CPUs without PAE, SSE2 and NX are not supported in this version.

Windows 8 garnered a mixed to negative reception upon launch. Although the reaction to its performance improvements, security enhancements, and improved support for touchscreen devices was positive, the new user interface was widely criticized as confusing and unintuitive, especially when used with a keyboard and mouse rather than a touchscreen. Despite these shortcomings, 60 million licenses were sold through January 2013, including upgrades and sales to OEMs for new PCs.

Windows 8 was succeeded by Windows 8.1 in October 2013, which addressed some aspects of Windows 8 that were criticized by reviewers and early adopters and also incorporated various improvements. Support for RTM editions of Windows 8 ended on January 12, 2016, and with the exception of Windows Embedded 8 Standard users, all users are required to install the Windows 8.1 update. Mainstream support for the Embedded Standard edition of Windows 8 ended on July 10, 2018, and extended support ended on July 11, 2023.

== Development ==
=== Early development ===
Development started in 2008 before Microsoft shipped Windows 7. At the Consumer Electronics Show (CES) in January 2011, it was announced that the next version of Windows would add support for ARM system-on-chips alongside the existing 32-bit processors produced by vendors, especially AMD and Intel. Windows division president Steven Sinofsky demonstrated an early build of the port on prototype devices, while Microsoft CEO Steve Ballmer announced the company's goal for Windows to be "everywhere on every kind of device without compromise." Details also began to surface about a new application framework for Windows 8 codenamed "Jupiter", which would be used to make "immersive" applications using XAML (similarly to Windows Phone and Silverlight) that could be distributed via a new packaging system and a rumored application store.

The earliest available build of Windows 8 is build 7700, compiled in January 2010. The build was almost identical to Windows 7 except for the wallpaper being different—the same one from the Beta and Release Candidate. In addition, there were a few references to Windows 8 in this build's Local Group Policy Editor Utility.

In late 2010, an optional 3D desktop user interface for high-end systems named "Wind" was rumored.

Two milestone releases of Windows 8 and one of Windows Server 2012 were leaked to the general public. Milestone 1, Build 7850, was leaked on April 12, 2011. It was the first build where the title of a window was written centered instead of aligned to the left. It was also probably the first appearance of the Metro-style font, and its wallpaper had the text "shhh... let's not leak our hard work" in a dark blue-green gradient background. However, its detailed build number reveals that the build was created on September 22, 2010. The leaked copy was the Enterprise edition, with other editions leaking later. In 2020, it was discovered that Metro existed in this build, after disabling the Redpill feature lockout. The start screen was very primitive, being a screen with a white background and gray tiles showing all installed apps. The charms bar was also included, but was unusable. The OS still reads as "Windows 7". Milestone 2, Build 7955, was leaked on April 25, 2011. The traditional Blue screen of death (BSoD) was replaced by a new black screen, although it was later reverted to a different blue color in later builds. This build introduced a new ribbon in Windows Explorer. The "Windows 7" logo was temporarily replaced with text displaying "Microsoft Confidential". Both builds 7850 and 7955 leaked alongside Windows Server 2012 build 7959. On June 17, 2011, the 64-bit edition of build 7989 was leaked. It introduced a new boot screen featuring the same Betta fish as the default Windows 7 Beta wallpaper, which was later replaced, and the circling dots as featured in the final build (although the final version comes with smaller circling dots throbber). It also had the text Welcome below them, although this was scrapped.

On June 1, 2011, Microsoft unveiled Windows 8's new user interface, as well as additional features at both Computex Taipei and the D9: All Things Digital conference in California.

The "Building Windows 8" blog launched on August 15, 2011, featuring details surrounding Windows 8's features and its development process.

=== Previews ===
A screenshot of Windows Developer Preview running on a multi-monitor system, showcasing some features

Microsoft would unveil more Windows 8 features and improvements on the first day of the first Microsoft Build conference on September 13, 2011. The first public beta build of Windows 8—Windows Developer Preview (build 8102)—was released at the event. A Samsung tablet running the build was also distributed to conference attendees.

The build was released for download later that day in 32-bit and 64-bit variants, and a special 64-bit variant which included SDKs and developer tools (Visual Studio Express and Microsoft Expression Blend) for developing Metro-style apps. The Windows Store was also announced during the presentation, but was not available in this build. According to Microsoft, there were about 535,000 downloads of the developer preview within the first 12 hours of its release. Originally set to expire on March 11, 2012, the Developer Preview's expiry date was changed to January 15, 2013 in February 2012.

On February 17, 2012, Microsoft unveiled a new logo for Windows 8. Designed by Pentagram partner Paula Scher, the Windows logo was changed to resemble a set of four window panes. Additionally, the entire logo is now rendered in a single solid color.

On February 29, 2012, Microsoft released the Windows 8 Consumer Preview, the beta version of Windows 8, build 8250. Alongside other changes, the build brought over the big change from build 8195: removing the Start button from the taskbar for the first time in a public build since its debut on Windows 95; according to Windows manager Chaitanya Sareen, the Start button was removed to reflect their view that on Windows 8, the desktop was an app itself, and not the primary interface of the operating system. Windows president Steven Sinofsky said more than 100,000 changes had been made since the developer version went public. The day after its release, Windows 8 Consumer Preview had been downloaded over one million times. Like the Developer Preview, the Consumer Preview expired on January 15, 2013.

Many other builds may exist or were released until the Japan's Developers Day conference when Sinofsky announced that Windows 8 Release Preview (build 8400) would be released during the first week of June. On May 28, 2012, Windows 8 Release Preview (Standard Simplified Chinese x64 edition, not China-specific variant, build 8400) was leaked online on various Chinese and BitTorrent websites. On May 31, 2012, Windows 8 Release Preview was released to the public by Microsoft. Major items in the Release Preview included the addition of various pre-installed Metro apps (such as Sports, Travel, and News), along with an integrated variant of Adobe Flash Player in Internet Explorer. Like the Developer Preview and the Consumer Preview, the release preview expired on January 15, 2013.

=== Release ===
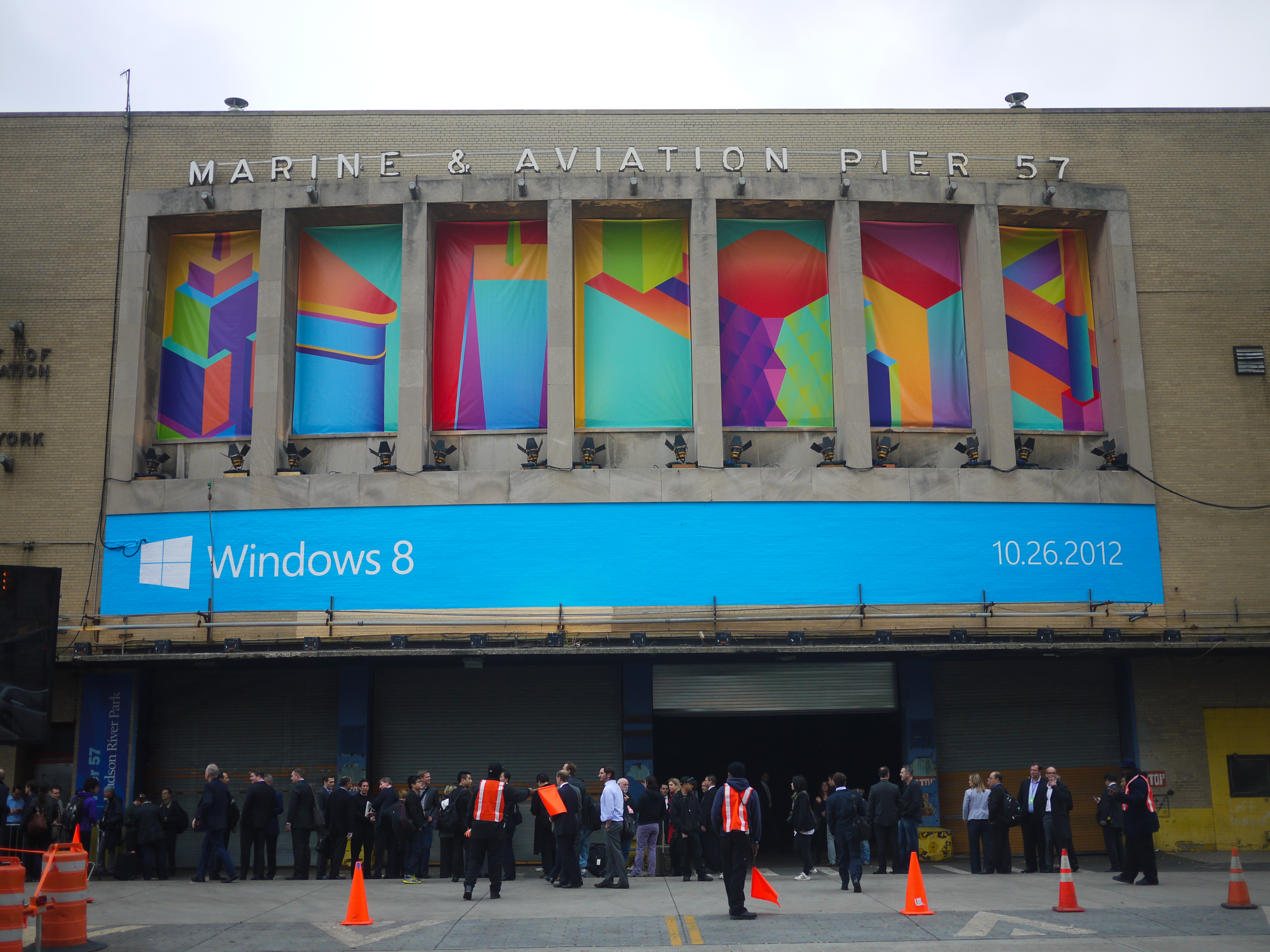
Windows 8 launch event at Pier 57 in New York City

On August 1, 2012, Windows 8 (build 9200) was released to manufacturing with the build number 6.2.9200.16384, and Microsoft planned to hold a launch event on October 25, 2012 before releasing it for general availability the next day. However, only a day after its release to manufacturing, a copy of the final version of Windows 8 Enterprise N (a variant for European markets which lacks bundled media players to comply with an antitrust ruling) was leaked online, followed by leaks of the final versions of Windows 8 Pro and Enterprise a few days later. On August 15, 2012, Windows 8 was made available to download for MSDN and TechNet subscribers, and was made available to Software Assurance customers on August 16, 2012. It was made available for students with a DreamSpark Premium subscription on August 22, 2012, earlier than advertised. Windows 8 became generally available for retail purchase on October 26, 2012.

Relatively few changes were made from the Release Preview to the final version. These included updated versions of bundled apps, the renaming of Windows Explorer to File Explorer, the replacement of the Aero Glass theme from Windows Vista and 7 with a new flat and solid-color theme as seen in build 8432, and the addition of new background options for the Start screen, lock screen, and desktop. Prior to its general availability on October 26, 2012, updates were released for some of Windows 8's bundled apps, and a "General Availability Cumulative Update" (which included fixes to improve performance, compatibility, and battery life) was released on Tuesday, October 9, 2012. Microsoft stated that due to improvements to its testing infrastructure, general improvements of this nature were to be released more frequently through Windows Update instead of being relegated to OEMs and service packs only.

Microsoft began an advertising campaign centered around Windows 8 and its Surface tablet in October 2012, starting with its first television advertisement premiering on October 14, 2012. The advertising budget of US$1.5–1.8 billion was significantly larger than the US$200 million campaign used to promote Windows 95. As part of its campaign, Microsoft set up 34 pop-up stores inside malls to showcase the Surface product line, and provided training for retail employees in partnership with Intel. In an effort to make retail displays of Windows 8 devices more "personal" by exemplifying real-world usage, Microsoft developed a character known in English-speaking markets as "Allison Brown", whose fictional profile (including personal photos, contacts, and emails) was featured on in-store demo units of Windows 8 devices.

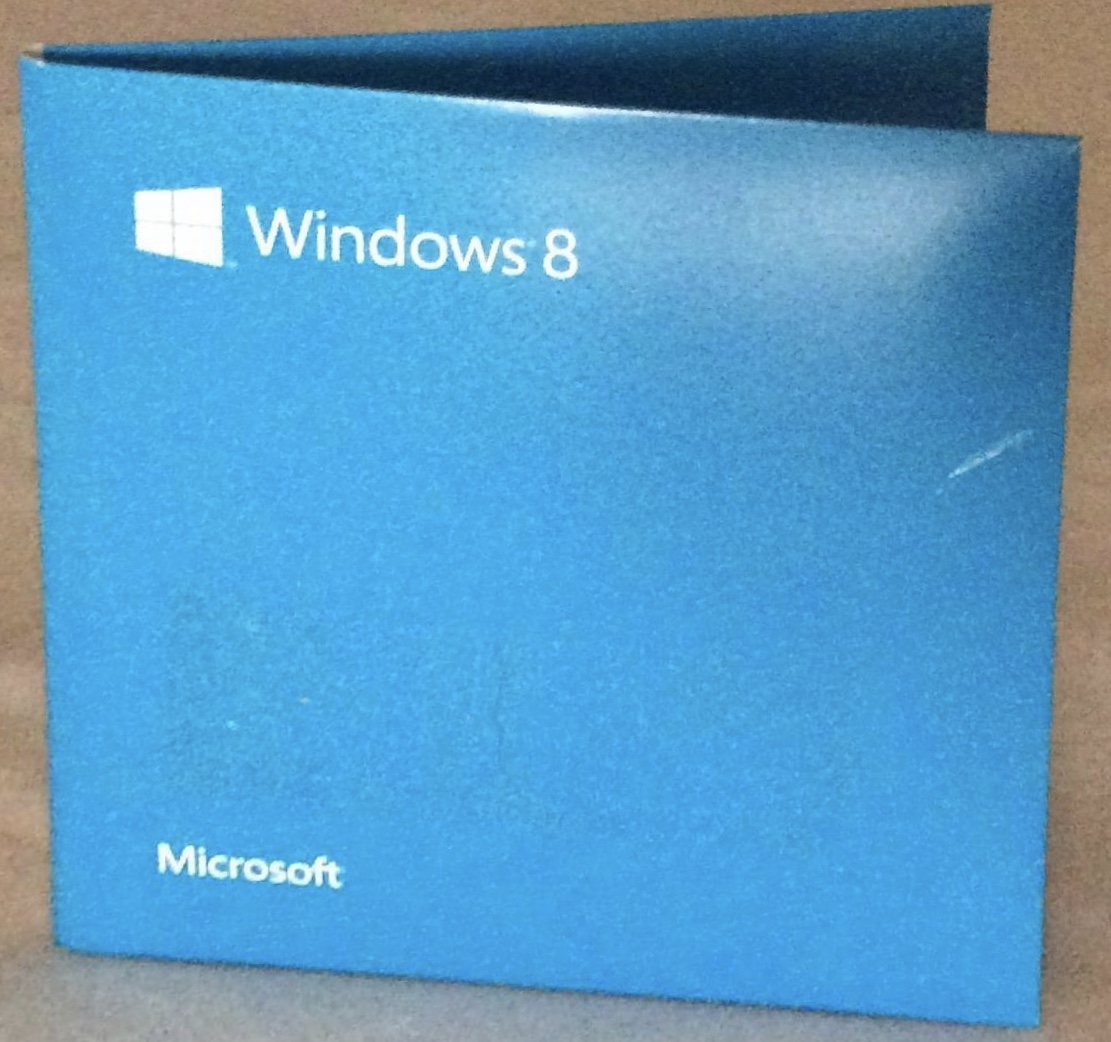
Windows 8 Pro DVD case, containing a 32-bit and a 64-bit installation disc

In May 2013, Microsoft launched a new television campaign for Windows 8 illustrating the capabilities and pricing of Windows 8 tablets in comparison to the iPad, which featured the voice of Siri remarking on the iPad's limitations in a parody of Apple's "Get a Mac" advertisements. On June 12, 2013, during game 1 of the 2013 Stanley Cup Finals, Microsoft premiered the first ad in its "Windows Everywhere" campaign, which promoted Windows 8, Windows Phone 8, and the company's suite of online services as an interconnected platform. Microsoft also announced that it would partner with electronics store chain Best Buy to convert PC departments at locations in the United States and Canada into a Windows-branded store-within-a-store that would showcase Microsoft products, services, and Windows devices.

== New and updated features ==
New features and functionality in Windows 8 include a faster startup through UEFI integration and the new "Hybrid Boot" mode (which hibernates the Windows kernel on shutdown to speed up the subsequent boot), a new lock screen with a clock and notifications, and the ability for enterprise users to create live USB variants of Windows (also known as Windows To Go). It also includes native support for USB 3 devices, which allow for faster data transfers and improved power management with compatible devices, and hard disk 4KB Advanced Format support, as well as support for near field communication to facilitate sharing and communication between devices.

Windows Explorer, which has been renamed to File Explorer, now includes a ribbon in place of the command bar. File operation dialog boxes have been updated to provide more detailed statistics, the ability to pause file transfers, and improvements in the ability to manage conflicts when copying files. A new "File History" function allows incremental revisions of files to be backed up to and restored from a secondary storage device, while Storage Spaces allows users to combine different sized hard disks into virtual drives and specify mirroring, parity, or no redundancy on a folder-by-folder basis. For easier management of files and folders, Windows 8 introduces the ability to move selected files or folders via drag and drop from a parent folder into a subfolder listed within the breadcrumb hierarchy of the address bar in File Explorer.

Task Manager has been redesigned, including a new processes tab with the option to display fewer or more details of running applications and background processes, a heat map using different colors indicating the level of resource usage, network and disk counters, grouping by process type (e.g. applications, background processes and Windows processes), friendly names for processes and a new option which allows users to search the web to find information about obscure processes. Additionally, the Blue Screen of Death has been updated with a simpler and modern design with less technical information displayed.

=== Safety and security ===
New security features in Windows 8 include two new authentication methods tailored towards touchscreens (PINs and picture passwords), the addition of antivirus capabilities to Windows Defender (bringing it in parity with Microsoft Security Essentials). SmartScreen filtering integrated into Windows, Family Safety offers parental controls, which allows parents to monitor and manage their children's activities on a device with activity reports and safety controls. Windows 8 also provides integrated system recovery through the new "Refresh" and "Reset" functions, including system recovery from USB drive. Windows 8's first security patches would be released on November 13, 2012; it would contain three fixes deemed "critical" by the company.

Windows 8 supports a feature of the UEFI specification known as "Secure boot", which uses a public-key infrastructure to verify the integrity of the operating system and prevent unauthorized programs such as bootkits from infecting the device's boot process. Some pre-built devices may be described as "certified" by Microsoft; these must have secure boot enabled by default, and provide ways for users to disable or re-configure the feature. ARM-based Windows RT devices must have secure boot permanently enabled.

=== Online services and functionality ===
Windows 8 provides tighter integration with online services from Microsoft and others. A user can now log into Windows with a Microsoft account, which can be used to access services and synchronize applications and settings between multiple devices. A client app for Microsoft's SkyDrive cloud storage service allows apps to save files directly to SkyDrive. However, a SkyDrive client for the desktop and File Explorer is not included in Windows 8, and must be downloaded separately. Bundled multimedia apps are provided under the Xbox brand, including Xbox Music, Xbox Video, and the Xbox SmartGlass companion for use with an Xbox 360 console. Games can integrate into an Xbox Live hub app, which also allows users to view their profile and Gamerscore. Other bundled apps provide the ability to link Flickr and Facebook. Due to Facebook Connect service changes, Facebook support is disabled in all bundled apps effective June 8, 2015.

Internet Explorer 10 is included as two variants – a desktop program and a touch-optimized app. It also includes increased support for HTML5, CSS3, and hardware acceleration. The app does not support plugins or ActiveX components, but includes a variant of Adobe Flash Player that is optimized for touch and low-power usage. Initially, Adobe Flash would only work on sites included on a "Compatibility View" whitelist; however, after feedback from users and additional compatibility tests, an update in March 2013 changed this behavior to use a smaller blacklist of sites with known compatibility issues instead, allowing Flash to be used with most sites by default. The desktop variant does not contain these limitations.

Windows 8 also incorporates improved support for mobile broadband; the operating system can now detect the insertion of a SIM card and automatically configure connection settings (including APNs and carrier branding), and reduce its Internet usage to conserve bandwidth on metered networks. An integrated airplane mode setting enables users to globally disable all wireless connectivity. Carriers can also offer account management systems through Windows Store apps, which can be automatically installed as a part of the connection process and offer usage statistics on their respective tile.

=== Windows Store apps ===
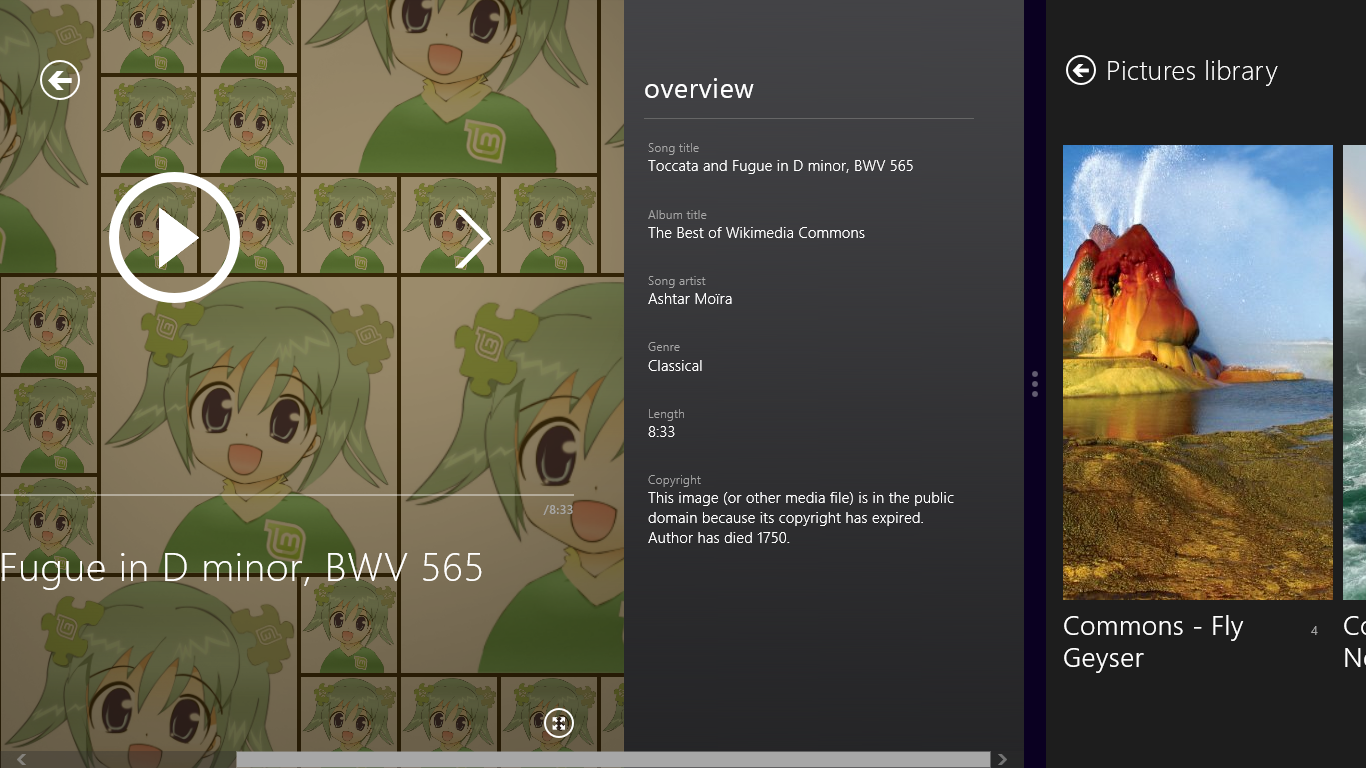
Snap feature: Xbox Music, alongside Photos snapped into a sidebar to the right side of the screen

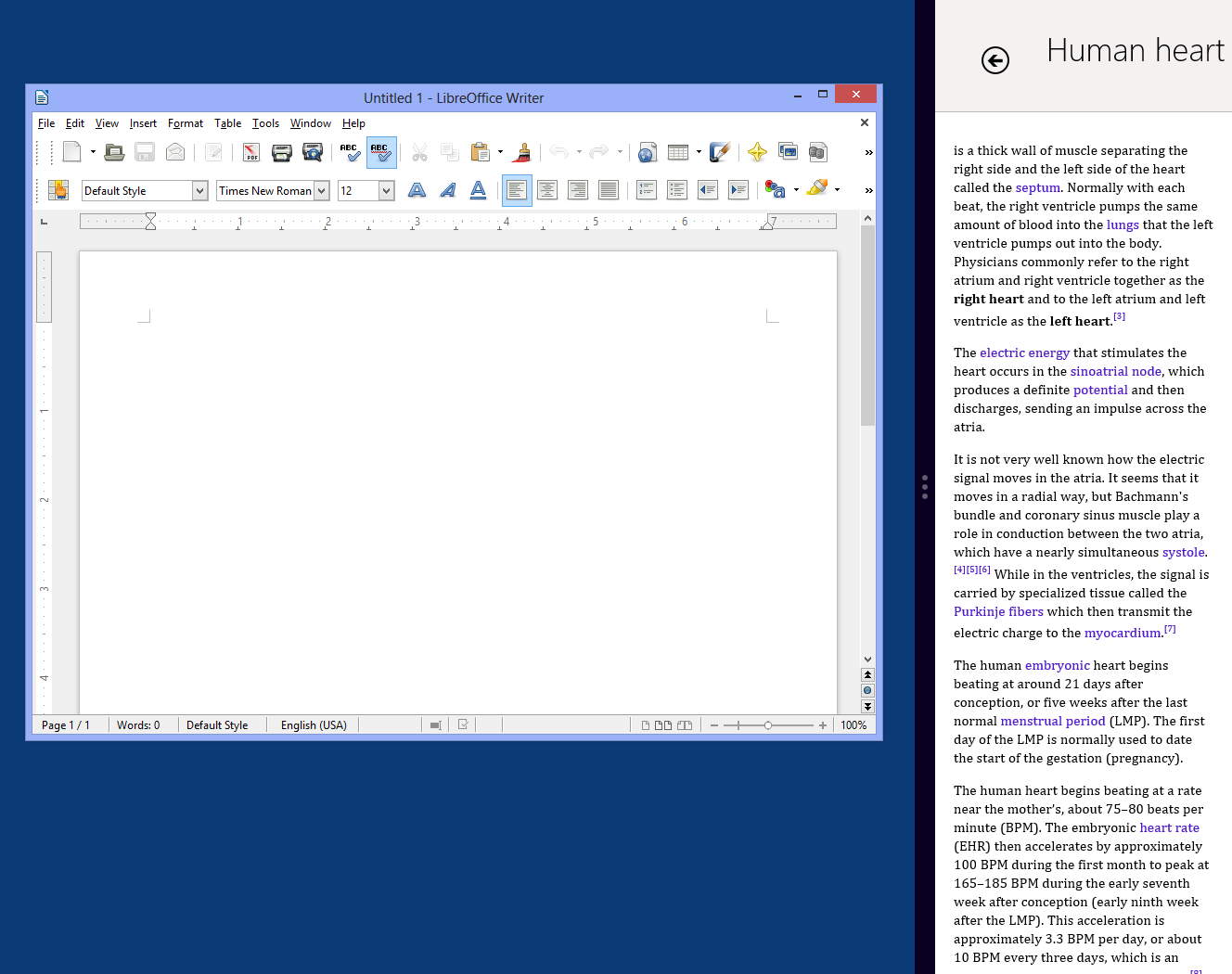
Snap feature: Desktop, alongside the Wikipedia app snapped into a sidebar to the right side of the screen. In Windows 8, desktop and everything on it is treated as one Metro-style app.

Windows 8 introduces a new style of application, Windows Store apps. According to Microsoft developer Jensen Harris, these apps are optimized for touchscreen environments and are more specialized than current desktop applications. Apps can run either in a full-screen mode or be snapped to the side of a screen. Apps can provide toast notifications on screen or animate their tiles on the Start screen with dynamic content. Apps can use "contracts"; a collection of hooks to provide common functionality that can integrate with other apps, including search and sharing. Apps can also provide integration with other services; for example, the People app can connect to a variety of different social networks and services (such as Facebook, Skype, and People service), while the Photos app can aggregate photos from services such as Facebook and Flickr.

Windows Store apps run within a new set of APIs known as Windows Runtime, which supports programming languages such as C, C++, Visual Basic .NET, C#, along with HTML5 and JavaScript. If written in some "high-level" languages, apps written for Windows Runtime can be compatible with both Intel and ARM variants of Windows, otherwise they are not binary code compatible. Components may be compiled as Windows Runtime Components, permitting their use by all compatible languages. To ensure stability and security, apps run within a sandboxed environment, and require permissions to use certain other functionalities, such as accessing the Internet or a camera.

Retail variants of Windows 8 are only able to install these apps through Windows Store – a namesake distribution platform that offers both apps, and listings for desktop programs certified for comparability with Windows 8. A method to sideload apps from outside Windows Store is available to devices running Windows 8 Enterprise and joined to a domain; Windows 8 Pro and Windows RT devices that are not part of a domain can also sideload apps, but only after special product keys are obtained through volume licensing.

The term "Immersive app" had been used internally by Microsoft developers to refer to the apps prior to the first official presentation of Windows 8, after which they were referred to as "Metro-style apps" in reference to the Metro design language. The term was phased out in August 2012; a Microsoft spokesperson denied rumors that the change was related to a potential trademark issue, and stated that "Metro" was only a codename that would be replaced prior to Windows 8's release. Following these reports, the terms "Modern UI-style apps", "Windows 8-style apps", and "Windows Store apps" began to be used in various Microsoft documents and material to refer to the new apps. In an interview on September 12, 2012, Soma Somasegar (vice president of Microsoft's development software division) confirmed that "Windows Store apps" would be the official term for the apps. An MSDN page explaining the Metro design language uses the term "Modern design" to refer to the language as a whole.

==== Web browsers ====
Exceptions to the restrictions faced by Windows Store apps are given to web browsers. The user's default browser can distribute a Metro-style web browser in the same package as the desktop variant, which has access to functionality unavailable to other apps, such as being able to permanently run in the background, use multiple background processes, and use Windows API code instead of WinRT (allowing for code to be re-used with the desktop variant, while still taking advantage of features available to Windows Store apps, such as charms). Microsoft advertises this exception privilege "New experience enabled" (formerly "Metro-style enabled").

The developers of both Chrome and Firefox committed to developing Metro-style variants of their browsers; while Chrome's "Windows 8 mode" (discontinued on Chrome version 49) uses a full-screen version of the existing desktop interface, Firefox's variant (which was first made available on the "Aurora" release channel in September 2013) uses a touch-optimized interface inspired by the Android variant of Firefox. In October 2013, Chrome's app was changed to mimic the desktop environment used by ChromeOS. Development of the Firefox app for Windows 8 has since been cancelled, citing a lack of user adoption of the beta versions.

=== Interface and desktop ===
Windows 8 introduces significant changes to the operating system's user interface, many of which are aimed at improving its experience on tablet computers and other touchscreen devices. The new user interface is based on Microsoft's Metro design language and uses a Start screen similar to that of Windows Phone 7 as the primary means of launching applications. The Start screen displays a customizable array of tiles linking to various apps and desktop programs, some of which can display constantly updated information and content through "live tiles". As a form of multi-tasking, apps can be snapped to the side of a screen. Alongside the traditional Control Panel, a new simplified and touch-optimized settings app known as "PC Settings" is used for basic configuration and user settings. It does not include many of the advanced options still accessible from the Control Panel.

A vertical toolbar known as the charms (accessed by swiping from the right edge of a touchscreen, swiping from the right edge of a touchpad, or pointing the cursor at hotspots in the right corners of a screen) provides access to system and app-related functions, such as search, sharing, device management, settings, and a Start button. The traditional desktop environment for running desktop applications is accessed via a tile on the Start screen. The Start button on the taskbar from previous versions of Windows has been converted into a hotspot (or "hot corner") in the lower-left corner of the screen, which displays a large tooltip displaying a thumbnail of the Start screen. Windows 8.1 added the start button back to the taskbar after many complaints, but removed the preview thumbnail. Swiping from the left edge of a touchscreen or clicking in the top-left corner of the screen allows one to switch between apps and Desktop. Pointing the cursor at the top-left corner of the screen and moving down reveals a thumbnail list of active apps. Aside from the removal of the Start button and the replacement of the Aero Glass theme with a flatter and solid-colored design, the desktop interface on Windows 8 is similar to that of Windows 7.

== Removed features ==
Several notable features were removed in Windows 8: support for playing DVD-Video was removed from Windows Media Player due to the cost of licensing the necessary decoders (especially for devices which do not include optical disc drives at all) and the prevalence of online streaming services. For the same reasons, Windows Media Center is not included by default on Windows 8, but Windows Media Center and DVD playback support could be purchased in the "Pro Pack" (which upgrades the system to Windows 8 Pro) or the "Media Center Pack" add-on for Windows 8 Pro. As with prior versions, third-party DVD player software can still be used to enable DVD playback. Also, Windows Media Player itself is no longer the default media player software in Windows 8, replaced by Xbox Music and Xbox Video, but remains covertly pre-installed.

Backup and Restore, the backup component of Windows, was deprecated. It still shipped with Windows 8 and continues to work on preset schedules, but it was pushed to the background and can only be accessed through a Control Panel applet called "Windows 7 File Recovery". Shadow Copy, a component of Windows Explorer that once saved previous versions of changed files, no longer protects local files and folders. It can only access previous versions of shared files stored on a Windows Server computer. The subsystem on which these components worked, however, is still available for other software to use.

Support for older XPDM and VGA display adapter drivers was removed in favor of heightened kernel stability, GPU scheduling performance and security.

== Hardware requirements ==
=== PCs ===
The minimum system requirements for Windows 8 are higher than those of Windows 7. The CPU must support the Physical Address Extension (PAE), NX bit, and SSE2 instruction sets. Windows Store apps require a screen resolution of 1024×768 or higher to run; a resolution of 1366×768 or higher is required to use the snap functionality. To receive certification, Microsoft requires candidate x86 systems to resume from standby in 2 seconds or less.

Minimum hardware requirements for Windows 8
| Component | Minimum | Recommended |
|---|---|---|
| Processor | 1 GHz clock rate IA-32 or x64 architecture Support for PAE, NX and SSE2 | x64 architecture Second Level Address Translation (SLAT) support for Hyper-V |
| Memory (RAM) | IA-32 edition: 1 GB x64 edition: 2 GB | 4 GB |
| Graphics Card | DirectX 9 graphics device WDDM 1.0 or higher driver | DirectX 10 graphics device |
| Display screen | 1366 × 768 pixels | —N/a |
| Input device | Keyboard and mouse | multi-touch display screen |
| Hard disk space | IA-32 edition: 16 GB x64 edition: 20 GB | —N/a |
| Other | —N/a | UEFI v2.3.1 Errata B with Microsoft Windows Certification Authority in its database Trusted Platform Module (TPM); Internet connectivity |

Microsoft's Connected Standby specification, which hardware vendors may optionally comply with, sets new power consumption requirements that are higher than the above minimum specifications. Included in this standard are a number of security-specific requirements designed to improve physical security, notably against Cold Boot Attacks.

32-bit SKUs of Windows 8 only support a maximum of 4 GB of RAM. 64-bit SKUs, however, support more: Windows 8 x64 supports 128 GB while Windows 8 Pro and Enterprise x64 support 512 GB.

Maximum number of physical processors that Windows 8 supports is: 1 for Core and RT, and 2 for Pro and Enterprise.

Maximum number of logical processors that Windows 8 supports is: 32 for 32-bit (x86-32), and 256 for 64-bit (x86-64).

In January 2016, Microsoft announced that, effective July 17, 2018, it would no longer support Windows 8.1 or 7 on devices using Intel's Skylake CPU family, and that all future CPU microarchitectures, as well as Skylake systems after this date, would only be supported on Windows 10. After the deadline, only critical security updates would be released for users on these platforms. When this new policy faced criticism from users and enterprise customers, Microsoft partially retracted the change and stated that both operating systems would remain supported on Skylake hardware through the end of their extended-support lifecycle. Windows 8.1 remains officially unsupported on all newer CPU families, and neither AMD or Intel will provide official chipset drivers for Windows operating systems other than Windows 10. However, in August 2016, Microsoft again extended the Skylake support policy until the end of support for Windows 7 and 8.1 (2020 and 2023, respectively).

=== Tablets and convertibles ===
Microsoft released minimum hardware requirements for tablet and laplet devices to be "certified" for Windows 8 and defined a convertible form factor as a standalone device that combines the PC, display, and rechargeable power source with a mechanically attached keyboard and pointing device in a single chassis. A convertible can be transformed into a tablet where the attached input devices are hidden or removed, leaving the display as the only input mechanism. On March 12, 2013, Microsoft amended its certification requirements to only require that screens on tablets have a minimum resolution of 1024×768 (down from the previous 1366×768). The amended requirement is intended to allow "greater design flexibility" for future products.

Hardware certification requirements for Windows tablets
| Graphics card | DirectX 10 graphics device with WDDM 1.2 or higher driver |
| Storage | 10 GB free space, after the out-of-box experience completes |
| Standard buttons | Power, Rotation lock, Windows key, Volume up, Volume down |
| Screen | Touch screen supporting a minimum of 5-point digitizers and resolution of at least 1024×768. The physical dimensions of the display panel must match the aspect ratio of the native resolution, which can be greater than 1024 (horizontally) and 768 (vertically). Minimum native color depth is 32-bits. If the display resolution is below 1366×768, disclaimers must be included in documentation to notify users that the Snap function is not available. |
| Camera | Minimum 720p |
| Accelerometer | 3 axes with data rates at or above 50 Hz |
| USB 2.0 | At least one controller and exposed port. |
| Connect | Wi-Fi and Bluetooth 4.0 + LE (low energy) |
| Other | Speaker, microphone, magnetometer and gyroscope. If a mobile broadband device is integrated into a tablet or convertible system, then an assisted GPS radio is required. Devices supporting near field communication need to have visual marks to help users locate and use the proximity technology. The new interrupt button combination, to replace Ctrl + Alt + Del, is Windows Key + Power. |

Updated certification requirements were implemented to coincide with Windows 8.1. As of 2014, all certified devices with integrated displays must contain a 720p webcam and higher quality speakers and microphones, while all certified devices that support Wi-Fi must support Bluetooth as well. As of 2015, all certified devices must contain Trusted Platform Module 2.0 chips.

== Editions ==
Windows 8 is available in three different editions, of which only the base edition, branded simply as Windows 8, and Windows 8 Pro, were sold at retail in most countries, and as pre-loaded software on new computers. Each edition of Windows 8 includes all of the capabilities and features of the edition preceding it, and add additional features oriented towards their market segments. For example, Pro added BitLocker, Hyper-V, the ability to join a domain, and the ability to install Windows Media Center as a paid add-on. Users of Windows 8 can purchase a "Pro Pack" license that upgrades their system to Windows 8 Pro through Add features to Windows. This license also includes Windows Media Center. Windows 8 Enterprise contains additional features aimed towards business environments, and is only available through volume licensing. A port of Windows 8 for ARM architecture, Windows RT, is marketed as an edition of Windows 8, but was only included as pre-loaded software on devices specifically developed for it.

Windows 8 was distributed as a retail box product on DVD, and through a digital download that could be converted into DVD or USB install media. From its launch until January 31, 2013, as part of a launch promotion, Microsoft offered Windows 8 Pro upgrades at a discounted price of US$39.99 online, or $69.99 for a retail box; afterward the Windows 8 price has been $119.99 and the Pro price $199.99. Those who purchased new PCs pre-loaded with Windows 7 Home Basic, Home Premium, Professional, or Ultimate between June 2, 2012, and January 31, 2013, could digitally purchase a Windows 8 Pro upgrade for US$14.99. Several PC manufacturers offered rebates and refunds on Windows 8 upgrades obtained through promotions on select models, such as those of Hewlett-Packard (in the U.S. and Canada on select models) and Acer (in Europe on selected Ultrabook models). During these promotions, the Windows Media Center add-on for Windows 8 Pro was also offered for free.

Unlike previous versions of Windows, Windows 8 was distributed at retail only under "Upgrade" licenses, which require an onboard version of Windows to install. The "full version software" SKU, which was more expensive but could be installed on computers without an eligible OS or none at all, was discontinued. In lieu of a full version, a specialized "System Builder" SKU was introduced. The "System Builder" replaced the original equipment manufacturer (OEM) SKU, which was only allowed for use on PCs meant for resale but added a "Personal Use License" exemption that officially allowed its purchase and personal use by users on homebuilt computers.

Retail distribution of Windows 8 has since been discontinued in favor of Windows 8.1. Unlike Windows 8, 8.1 is available as "full version software" as both a packaged DVD and online for download, and does not require a previous version of Windows in order to be installed. Pricing for these new copies remains identical with that of Windows 8. With the retail release of Windows 8.1 returning to being full version software, the "Personal Use License" exemption was removed from the OEM SKU, meaning that end users building their own PCs for personal use must use the full retail variant in order to satisfy the Windows 8.1 licensing requirements. Windows 8.1 with Bing is a special OEM-specific SKU of Windows 8.1 subsidized by Microsoft's Bing search engine.

== Software compatibility ==
The three desktop editions of Windows 8 support 32-bit and 64-bit architectures; retail copies of Windows 8 include install DVDs for both architectures, while the online installer automatically installs the variant corresponding with the architecture of the system's existing Windows installation. The 32-bit variant runs on CPUs compatible with the 3rd generation of the x86 architecture (known as IA-32) or newer, and can run 32-bit and 16-bit applications, although 16-bit support must be enabled first. (16-bit applications are developed for CPUs compatible with x86 2nd generation, first conceived in 1978. Microsoft started moving away from this architecture after Windows 95.)

The 64-bit variant runs on CPUs compatible with the 8th generation of x86 (known as x86-64, or x64) or newer, and can run 32-bit and 64-bit programs. 32-bit programs and operating system are restricted to supporting only 4 gigabytes of memory, while 64-bit systems can theoretically support 2048 gigabytes of memory. 64-bit operating systems require a different set of device drivers than those of 32-bit operating systems.

Windows RT, the only edition of Windows 8 for systems with ARM processors, only supports applications included with the system (such as a special variant of Office 2013), supplied through Windows Update, or Windows Store apps, to ensure that the system only runs applications that are optimized for the architecture. Windows RT does not support running IA-32 or x64 applications. Windows Store apps can either support both the x86 and ARM architectures, or can be compiled to support another specific architecture.

Support for IE10 on Windows Server 2012 and Windows Embedded 8 Standard ended on January 31, 2020.

== Reception ==
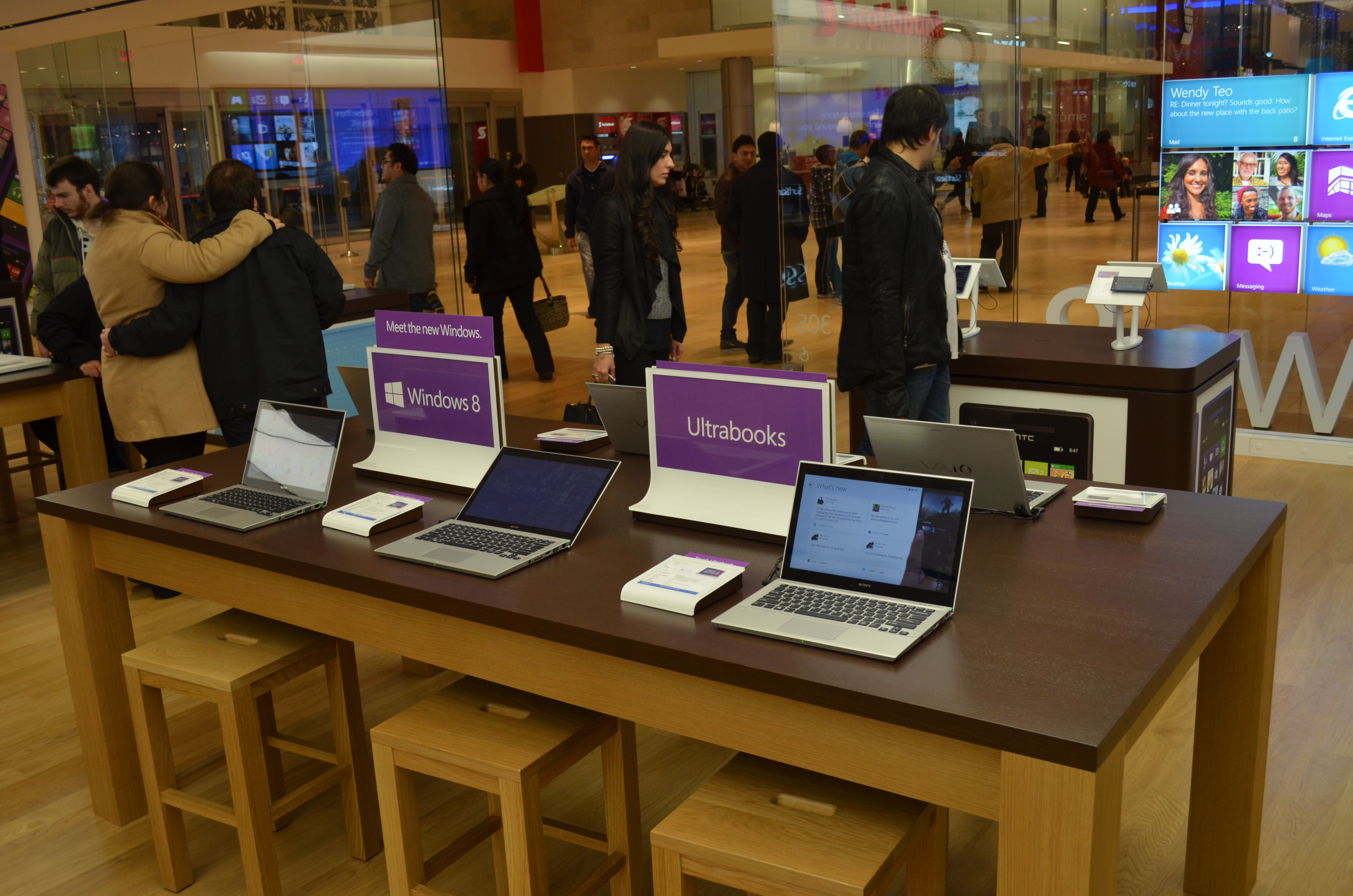
Windows 8 ultrabooks device showcase in a Microsoft Store in Toronto

=== Pre-release ===
Following the unveiling of Windows 8, Microsoft faced criticism (particularly from free software supporters) for mandating that devices receiving its optional certification for Windows 8 have UEFI Secure Boot enabled by default using a key provided by Microsoft. Concerns were raised that secure boot could prevent or hinder the use of alternate operating systems such as Linux. In a post discussing secure boot on the Building Windows 8 blog, Microsoft developer Tony Mangefeste indicated that vendors would provide means to customize secure boot, stating that "At the end of the day, the customer is in control of their PC. Microsoft's philosophy is to provide customers with the best experience first, and allow them to make decisions themselves." Microsoft's certification guidelines for Windows 8 ultimately revealed that vendors would be required to provide means for users to re-configure or disable secure boot in their device's UEFI firmware. It also revealed that ARM devices (Windows RT) would be required to have secure boot permanently enabled, with no way for users to disable it. However, Tom Warren of The Verge noted that other vendors have implemented similar hardware restrictions on their own ARM-based tablet and smartphone products (including those running Microsoft's own Windows Phone platform), but still argued that Microsoft should "keep a consistent approach across ARM and x86, though, not least because of the number of users who'd love to run Android alongside Windows 8 on their future tablets." No mandate was given regarding the installation of third-party certificates that would enable running alternative programs. While x86 / x64 versions of Windows 8 still include BIOS compatibility, but for OEM preinstalled Windows 8 copies, UEFI Secure Boot is mandatory for Microsoft's OEM validation.

Several notable video game developers criticized Microsoft for making its Windows Store a closed platform, subject to its own regulations, as it conflicted with their view of the PC as an open platform. Markus "Notch" Persson (creator of the indie game Minecraft), Gabe Newell (co-founder of Valve and developer of software distribution platform Steam), and Rob Pardo from Activision Blizzard voiced concern about the closed nature of the Windows Store. However, Tom Warren of The Verge stated that Microsoft's addition of the Store was simply responding to the success of both Apple and Google in pursuing the "curated application store approach."

=== Critical reception ===
Reviews of the various editions of Windows 8 were mixed to negative. Tom Warren of The Verge said that although Windows 8's emphasis on touch computing was significant and risked alienating desktop users, he felt that Windows 8 tablets "[make] an iPad feel immediately out of date" due to the capabilities of the operating system's hybrid model and increased focus on cloud services. David Pierce of The Verge described Windows 8 as "the first desktop operating system that understands what a computer is supposed to do in 2012" and praised Microsoft's "no compromise" approach and the operating system's emphasis on Internet connectivity and cloud services. Pierce also considered the Start Screen to be a "brilliant innovation for desktop computers" when compared with "folder-littered desktops on every other OS" because it allows users to interact with dynamic information. In contrast, an ExtremeTech article said that Windows 8 was Microsoft "flailing", and a review in PC Magazine condemned the Metro-style user interface. Some of the included apps in Windows 8 were considered to be basic and lacking in functionality, but the Xbox apps were praised for their promotion of a multi-platform entertainment experience. Other improvements and features (such as File History, Storage Spaces, and the updated Task Manager) were also regarded as positive changes. Peter Bright of Ars Technica wrote that while its user interface changes may overshadow them, Windows 8's improved performance, updated file manager, new storage functionality, expanded security features, and updated Task Manager were still positive improvements for the operating system. Bright also said that Windows 8's duality towards tablets and traditional PCs was an "extremely ambitious" aspect of the platform as well, but criticized Microsoft for emulating Apple's model of a closed distribution platform when implementing the Windows Store.

The user interface of Windows 8 has been the subject of negative reaction. Bright wrote that its system of hot corners and edge swiping "wasn't very obvious" due to the lack of instructions provided by the operating system on the functions accessed through the user interface, even by the video tutorial added on the RTM release (which only instructed users to point at corners of the screen or swipe from its sides). Despite this "stumbling block", Bright said that Windows 8's interface worked well in some places, but began to feel incoherent when switching between the "Metro" and desktop environments, sometimes through inconsistent means. Tom Warren of The Verge wrote that the new interface was "as stunning as it is surprising", contributing to an "incredibly personal" experience once it is customized by the user, but had a steep learning curve, and was awkward to use with a keyboard and mouse. He noted that while forcing all users to use the new touch-oriented interface was a risky move for Microsoft as a whole, it was necessary in order to push the development of apps for the Windows Store. Others, such as Adrian Kingsley-Hughes from ZDNet, considered the interface to be "clumsy and impractical" due to its inconsistent design (going as far as considering it "two operating systems unceremoniously bolted together"), and concluded that "Windows 8 wasn't born out of a need or demand; it was born out of a desire on Microsoft's part to exert its will on the PC industry and decide to shape it in a direction—touch and tablets—that allows it to compete against, and remain relevant in the face of Apple's iPad."

On January 2012, Microsoft's Windows division announced that the devices with Windows 8 preinstalled, must implement and enable UEFI Class 3, including UEFI Secure Boot, to meet "Designed for Windows 8" validation, but without pre-notify OEMs such as Acer, ASUS and Lenovo.

On December 2012, Steven Sinofsky resigned from Microsoft because the critics of Windows 8 and Windows Phone 8.

In 2013, Frank X. Shaw, a Microsoft corporate vice president, said that while many of the negative reviews were extreme, it was a "good thing" that Microsoft was "listening to feedback and improving a product".

The American Customer Satisfaction Index (ACSI) reported a decline in Microsoft's customer satisfaction, the lowest it has been since Windows Vista.

=== Market share and sales ===
Microsoft says that about 4 million users upgraded to Windows 8 over the weekend after its release, which CNET says was well below Microsoft's internal projections and was described inside the company as disappointing.

On November 27, 2012, Microsoft announced that it had sold 40 million licenses of Windows 8 in the first month, surpassing the pace of Windows 7.

However, according to research firm NPD, sales of devices running Windows in the United States had declined 21 percent compared to the same time period in 2011. As the holiday shopping season wrapped up, Windows 8 sales continued to lag, even as Apple reported brisk sales. The market research firm IDC reported an overall drop in PC sales for the quarter, and said the drop may have been partly due to consumer reluctance to embrace the new features of the OS and poor support from OEM for these features. This capped the first year of declining PC sales to the Asia Pacific region, as consumers bought more mobile devices than Windows PCs.

Windows 8 surpassed Windows Vista in market share, with a 5.1% usage rate, according to numbers posted in July 2013 by Net Applications, with usage on a steady upward trajectory. However, intake of Windows 8 still lagged behind that of Windows Vista and Windows 7 at the same point in their release cycles. Windows 8's tablet market share also grew steadily, with 7.4% of tablets running Windows in Q1 2013, according to Strategy Analytics, up from nothing just a year before. However, this was still well below Android and iOS, which posted 43.4% and 48.2% market share respectively, although both operating systems had been on the market much longer than Windows 8. Strategy Analytics also noted "a shortage of top tier apps" for Windows tablets despite Microsoft strategy of paying developers to create apps for the operating system (in addition to those for Windows Phone).

In March 2013, Microsoft also amended its certification requirements to allow tablets to use the 1024×768 resolution as a minimum; this change is expected to allow the production of certified Windows 8 tablets in smaller form factors—a market which is currently dominated by Android-based tablets. Despite the reaction of industry experts, Microsoft reported that they had sold 100 million licenses in the first six months. This matched sales of Windows 7 over a similar period. This statistic includes shipments to channel warehouses which now need to be sold in order to make way for new shipments.

In January 2014, Hewlett-Packard began a promotion for desktops running Windows 7, saying that it was "back by popular demand". Outside sources have suggested that this might be because HP or its customers thought the Windows 8 platform would be more appropriate for mobile computing than desktop computing, or that they were looking to attract customers forced to switch from XP, who wanted a more familiar interface.

In February 2014, Bloomberg reported that Microsoft would be lowering the price of Windows 8 licenses by 70% for devices that retail under US$250; alongside the announcement that an update to the operating system would allow OEMs to produce devices with as little as 1 GB of RAM and 16 GB of storage, critics felt that these changes would help Windows compete against Linux-based devices in the low-end market, particularly those running ChromeOS. Microsoft had similarly cut the price of Windows XP licenses to compete against the early waves of Linux-based netbooks. Reports also indicated that Microsoft was planning to offer cheaper Windows 8 licenses to OEMs in exchange for setting Internet Explorer's default search engine to Bing. Some media outlets falsely reported that the SKU associated with this plan, "Windows 8.1 with Bing", was a variant which would be a free or low-cost variant of Windows 8 for consumers using older versions of Windows. On April 2, 2014, Microsoft ultimately announced that it would be removing license fees entirely for devices with screens smaller than 9 inches, and officially confirmed the rumored "Windows 8.1 with Bing" OEM SKU on May 23, 2014.

Based on information gathered by Net Applications, the market share of Windows 8 had consistently dropped below the 1% mark by June 2022.

=== Chinese government ban ===
In May 2014, the Government of China banned the internal purchase of Windows 8–based products under government contracts requiring "energy-efficient" devices. The Xinhua News Agency claimed that Windows 8 was being banned in protest of Microsoft's support lifecycle policy and the end of support for Windows XP (which, as of January 2014, had a market share of 49% in China), as the government "obviously cannot ignore the risks of running an OS without guaranteed technical support." However, Ni Guangnan of the Chinese Academy of Sciences had also previously warned that Windows 8 could allegedly expose users to surveillance by the United States government due to its heavy use of Internet-based services.

In June 2014, state broadcaster China Central Television (CCTV) broadcast a news story further characterizing Windows 8 as a threat to national security. The story featured an interview with Ni Guangnan, who stated that operating systems could aggregate "sensitive user information" that could be used to "understand the conditions and activities of our national economy and society", and alleged that per documents leaked by Edward Snowden, the U.S. government had worked with Microsoft to retrieve encrypted information. Yang Min, a computer scientist at Fudan University, also stated that "the security features of Windows 8 are basically to the benefit of Microsoft, allowing them control of the users' data, and that poses a big challenge to the national strategy for information security." Microsoft denied the claims in a number of posts on the Chinese social network Sina Weibo, posts which stated that the company had never "assisted any government in an attack of another government or clients" or provided client data to the U.S. government, never "provided any government the authority to directly visit", or placed any backdoors in its products and services, and that it had never concealed government requests for client data.

== Windows 8.1 ==
A minor version of Windows, known as Windows 8.1, was officially announced by Microsoft on May 14, 2013. Following a presentation devoted to it at Build 2013, a public beta version of the upgrade was released on June 26, 2013. Windows 8.1 was released to OEM hardware partners (RTM) on August 27, 2013, and released publicly as a free upgrade through Windows Store on October 17, 2013. Volume license customers and subscribers to MSDN Plus and TechNet Plus were initially unable to obtain the RTM version upon its release; a spokesperson said the policy was changed to allow Microsoft to work with OEMs "to ensure a quality experience at general availability." However, after criticism, Microsoft reversed its decision and released the RTM build on MSDN and TechNet on September 9, 2013.

Windows 8.1 addressed a number of criticisms faced by Windows 8 upon its release, with additional customization options for the Start screen, the restoration of a visible Start button on the desktop, the ability to snap up to four apps on a single display, and the ability to boot to the desktop instead of the Start screen. Windows 8's stock apps were also updated, a new Bing-based unified search system was added, SkyDrive (now OneDrive) was given tighter integration with the operating system, and a number of new stock apps, along with a tutorial, were added. Windows 8.1 also added support for 3D printing, Miracast media streaming, NFC printing, and Wi-Fi Direct.

Microsoft marketed Windows 8.1 as an "update" rather than as a "service pack", as it had done with such revisions for previous versions of Windows. Nonetheless, Microsoft's support lifecycle policy treats Windows 8.1 similarly, to previous Windows service packs: With the exception of Windows Embedded 8 Standard users, upgrading to 8.1 has been required to maintain access to mainstream support and updates after January 12, 2016. Although Windows 8 RTM is unsupported, Microsoft released an emergency security patch in May 2017 for Windows 8 RTM, as well as other unsupported versions of Windows (including Windows XP and Windows Server 2003), to address a vulnerability that was being leveraged by the WannaCry ransomware attack. Updates to apps published on Windows Store after July 1, 2019, are no longer available to Windows 8 RTM users.

Retail and OEM installations of Windows 8, Windows 8 Pro, and Windows RT can be upgraded through Windows Store, free of charge. However, volume license customers, TechNet or MSDN subscribers, and users of Windows 8 Enterprise must acquire standalone installation media for 8.1 and install through the traditional Windows setup process, either as an in-place upgrade or clean install. This requires an 8.1-specific product key.

== See also ==
- List of operating systems
- Features new to Windows 8

| Preceded by Windows 7 | Windows 8; 2012 | Succeeded by Windows 8.1 |
