= Google Fred =

Google search engine algorithm update

Google Fred is the common codename (Note: It was named this unofficially as part of an in-joke by a Google employee, which led to propagation elsewhere. Google never released an official designated name for the update.) for a search engine algorithm update which occurred on March 7, 2017. Its implementation and existence went unconfirmed by Google until March 24th. Google, however, "refused to comment on specifics, instead directing people to their Webmaster Quality Guidelines to understand why they might have been adversely affected." (Note: Some sites saw a steep decline, many even near 90 percent, in visitor traffic.) Despite the lack of transparency, a lot of speculation exists regarding the nature of the changes:

Th[e Fred] update ... penalized sites that prioritized monetization over user experience. If [a] site had low user engagement, was thin in content, or had content heavily geared toward conversions, pop-ups, and aggressive advertising, [it] lost ... rankings overnight.
