= Microsoft Developer Network =

Microsoft forum for developers and testers

- Website type: Knowledge base
- Available in: English
- Successor: Microsoft Docs
- Owner: Microsoft
- Website: msdn.microsoft.com at the Wayback Machine (archive index)
- Commercial: Yes
- Registration: Optional
- Launched: September 1992; 34 years ago
- Current status: Offline

The Microsoft Developer Network (MSDN) was the division of Microsoft responsible for managing the firm's relationship with developers and testers, such as hardware developers interested in the operating system (OS), and software developers developing on the various OS platforms or using the API or scripting languages of Microsoft's applications.

Starting in January 2020, the website was fully integrated with Microsoft Docs (itself integrated into Microsoft Learn in 2022).

== Websites ==
MSDN's primary web presence at msdn.microsoft.com was a collection of sites for the developer community that provided information, documentation, and discussion that was authored both by Microsoft and by the community at large. Microsoft later began placing emphasis on incorporation of forums, blogs, library annotations and social bookmarking to make MSDN an open dialog with the developer community rather than a one-way service. The main website, and most of its constituent applications below were available in 56 or more languages.

=== Library ===
MSDN Library was a library of official technical documentation intended for independent developers of software for Microsoft Windows. MSDN Library documented the APIs that ship with Microsoft products and also included sample code, technical articles, and other programming information. The library was freely available on the web, with CDs and DVDs of the most recent materials initially issued quarterly as part of an MSDN subscription. However, beginning in 2006, they were available to be freely downloaded from Microsoft Download Center in the form of ISO images.

Visual Studio Express edition integrated only with MSDN Express Library, which was a subset of the full MSDN Library, although either edition of the MSDN Library could be freely downloaded and installed standalone.

In Visual Studio 2010 MSDN Library was replaced with the new Help System, which was installed as a part of Visual Studio 2010 installation. Help Library Manager was used to install Help Content books covering selected topics.

In 2016, Microsoft introduced the new technical documentation platform, Microsoft Docs, intended as a replacement for the TechNet and MSDN libraries. Over the next two years, the content of the MSDN Library was gradually migrated into Microsoft Docs. In 2022, Microsoft Docs was itself incorporated into Microsoft Learn. MSDN Library pages now redirect to the corresponding Microsoft Learn pages.

==== Integration with Visual Studio ====
Each edition of MSDN Library could only be accessed with one help viewer (Microsoft Document Explorer or other help viewer), which was integrated with the then current single version or sometimes two versions of Visual Studio. In addition, each new version of Visual Studio did not integrate with an earlier version of MSDN. A compatible MSDN Library was released with each new version of Visual Studio and included on the Visual Studio DVD. As newer versions of Visual Studio were released, newer editions of MSDN Library did not integrate with older Visual Studio versions and did not even include old/obsolete documentation for deprecated or discontinued products. MSDN Library versions could be installed side-by-side, that is, both the older as well as the newer versions of MSDN Library could co-exist.

=== Forums ===
MSDN Forums were the web-based forums used by the community to discuss a wide variety of software development topics. MSDN Forums were migrated to an all-new platform during 2008 that provided new features designed to improve efficiency such as inline preview of threads, AJAX filtering, and a slide-up post editor.

=== Blogs ===
MSDN blogs was a series of blogs that were hosted under Microsoft's domain blogs.msdn.com. Some blogs were dedicated to a product – e.g. Visual Studio, Internet Explorer, PowerShell – or a version of a product – e.g. Windows 7, Windows 8 – while others belonged to a Microsoft employee, e.g. Michael Howard or Raymond Chen. In May 2020, the MSDN and TechNet blogs were closed and the content was archived at Microsoft Docs.

=== Social bookmarking ===
Social bookmarking on MSDN Social was first launched in 2008, built on a new web platform that had user-tagging and feeds at its core. The goal of the social bookmarking application was to provide a method whereby members of the developer community could:

- Contribute to a database of quality links on any topic from across the web. By filtering on one or more tags, (e.g. ".net" and "database") users could discover popular or recent links and subscribe to a feed of those links.
- Find and follow experts' recommended sites. Each profile page included a feed of the user's contributions. Users could be discovered through a drop-down menu on each bookmark.
- Demonstrate their expertise through the links displayed in their profile.
- Store their favorite links online.

The initial release of the application provided standard features for the genre, including a bookmarklet and import capabilities. The MSDN web site was also starting to incorporate feeds of social bookmarks from experts and the community, displayed alongside feeds from relevant bloggers.

The social bookmarking feature was discontinued on October 1, 2009.

=== Gallery ===
MSDN Gallery was a repository of community-authored code samples and projects. Launched in 2008, the purpose of the site evolved to complement Codeplex, the open-source project hosting site from Microsoft. MSDN Gallery was retired in 2019 and all MSDN pages now redirect to the new code samples experience on Microsoft Learn.

== Software subscriptions ==
MSDN had historically offered a subscription package whereby developers had access and licenses to use nearly all Microsoft software that had ever been released to the public. Subscriptions were sold on an annual basis, and cost anywhere from US$1,000 to US$6,000 per year per subscription, as it was offered in several tiers.

Although in most cases the software itself functioned exactly like the full product, the MSDN end-user license agreement prohibited use of the software in a business production environment. This was a legal restriction, not a technical one. An exception was made for Microsoft Office, allowing personal use even for business purposes without a separate license—but only with the "MSDN Premium Subscription" and even so only "directly related to the design, development and test and/or documentation of software projects;" this does not terminate

== MSDN Magazine ==
Microsoft provided editorial content for MSDN Magazine, a monthly publication. The magazine was created as a merger between Microsoft Systems Journal (MSJ) and Microsoft Internet Developer (MIND) magazines in March 2000.

MSJ back issues were available online. MSDN Magazine was available as a print magazine in the United States, and online in 11 languages. The last issue of the magazine was released in November 2019.

=== Microsoft Systems Journal ===
Microsoft Systems Journal was a 1986-founded bi-monthly Microsoft magazine.

== History ==
MSDN was launched in September 1992 as a quarterly, CD-ROM-based compilation of technical articles, sample code, and software development kits. The first two MSDN CD releases (September 1992 and January 1993) were marked as pre-release discs (P1 and P2, respectively). Disc 3, released in April 1993, was the first full release. In addition to CDs, there was a 16-page tabloid newspaper, Microsoft Developer Network News, edited by Andrew Himes, who had previously been the founding editor of MacTech, the premiere Macintosh technology journal. A Level II subscription was added in 1993, that included the MAPI, ODBC, TAPI and VFW SDKs.

MSDN logo, 2001–2009

MSDN2 was opened in November 2004 as a source for Visual Studio 2005 API information, with noteworthy differences being updated web site code, conforming better to web standards and thus giving a long-awaited improved support for alternative web browsers to Internet Explorer in the API browser. In 2008, the original MSDN cluster was retired and MSDN2 became msdn.microsoft.com.

=== Dr GUI and the MSDN Writers Team ===
In 1996, Bob Gunderson began writing a column in Microsoft Developer Network News, edited by Andrew Himes, using the pseudonym "Dr.GUI". The column provided answers to questions submitted by MSDN subscribers. The caricature of Dr. GUI was based on a photo of Gunderson. When he left the MSDN team, Dennis Crain took over the Dr. GUI role and added medical humor to the column. Upon his departure, Dr. GUI became the composite identity of the original group (most notably Paul Johns) of Developer Technology Engineers that provided in-depth technical articles to the Library. The early members included: Bob Gunderson, Dale Rogerson, Rüdiger R. Asche, Ken Lassesen, Nigel Thompson (a.k.a. Herman Rodent), Nancy Cluts, Paul Johns, Dennis Crain, and Ken Bergmann. Nigel Thompson was the development manager for Windows Multimedia Extensions that originally added multimedia capabilities to Windows. Renan Jeffreis produced the original system (Panda) to publish MSDN on the Internet and in HTML instead of the earlier multimedia viewer engine. Dale Rogerson, Nigel Thompson and Nancy Cluts all published MS Press books while on the MSDN team. As of August 2010, only Dennis Crain and Dale Rogerson remain employed by Microsoft.

== See also ==
- DreamSpark
- Microsoft TechNet
- The Code Room
- MDN Web Docs
