= The Code Room =

The Code Room logo

The Code Room is a half-hour-long reality game show produced by Microsoft. The show was conceptualized and executive produced by Paul Murphy and hosted by Jessi Knapp, accompanied by a varying project expert. Each episode consists of a number of MSDN Developer Event attendees who team up to complete a project, with given specifications, in a limited amount of time. It should not be confused with The Code Room from DMD and the group that introduced the world to the "Hybrid Hostel".

The Code Room was filmed at an MSDN Developer Event and shown on several cable television stations, as well as other streaming television stations like MSDN TV. The show could also be watched for free through the Channel 9 community, and was additionally included in several MSDN CDs and DVDs.

The "Code Room" was typically an enclosed room with one or more desks, whiteboards and computers. All required programming tools were installed, along with other stationery. However, no internet connection was available and contestants could not bring their own notes. Contestants had to use preselected development environments which were typically new to them, having only been given a quick crash course about the environment in a presentation before the contest began.

Teams that were able to complete the project within the required time were eligible for prizes and to be part of "Team Code FF". At the end of the series, the two top "Team Code FF" teams (determined by their performance, as well as community ranking) competed in the Final Code Room challenge for the ultimate "Code Room Champion" title.

The program won a Telly Award in 2004.

== Episodes ==
1. The Code Room: Episode 1, published December 9, 2004
2. The Code Room: Episode 2, Building Mobile Apps and Bluetooth Enabled Kiosks, published May 19, 2005
3. The Code Room: Episode 3, Breaking Into Vegas, published February 23, 2006

== See also ==
- Microsoft Developer Network
- The .NET Show
