= Microsoft Docs =

Microsoft technical documentation library

- Website type: Knowledge base
- Available in: Multiple languages
- Area served: Worldwide
- Owner: Microsoft
- Website: docs.microsoft.com at the Wayback Machine (archive index)
- Commercial: Yes
- Registration: Optional
- Launched: June 2016; 10 years ago
- Current status: Moved to Microsoft Learn

Microsoft Docs was a library of technical documentation for end users, developers, and IT professionals who work with Microsoft products. The Microsoft Docs website provided technical specifications, conceptual articles, tutorials, guides, API references, code samples and other information related to Microsoft software and web services. Microsoft Docs was introduced in June 2016 as a replacement for the MSDN and TechNet libraries which previously hosted some of these materials. Microsoft Docs initially contained only .NET documentation. The process of migrating the bulk of the MSDN and TechNet libraries' content took approximately two years.

In 2022, Microsoft Docs was made part of the Microsoft Learn site.

== Structure and features ==
The content on Microsoft Docs was organised into groups based on product or technology and steps of working with it: evaluating, getting started, planning, deploying, managing, and troubleshooting, and the navigation panel and product/service pages showed material breakdowns. The service allowed users to download specific docs sections as PDF files for offline use and included an estimated reading time for each article.

Each article was represented as a Markdown file in various GitHub repositories, and most of the documentation content was open-sourced and accepted pull requests. Microsoft released a set of Visual Studio Code extensions, Docs Authoring Pack, to assist in editing Microsoft Docs content. It included the support of Docs-specific markdown features.

== History ==
Microsoft Docs preview was introduced in June 2016, initially containing .NET documentation. The process of migrating the bulk of MSDN and TechNet libraries' content has taken approximately two years. Key events:

- November 2016: the documentation for Azure, Visual Studio 2017 RC, C++, ASP.NET Core, Entity Framework Core and SQL on Linux was added.
- September 2017: the documentation for Office SharePoint, Windows 10, Windows Server 2016, and BizTalk Server ITPro was migrated from MSDN/TechNet.
- February 2018: Microsoft added a new feedback system for Docs based on GitHub issues.
- September 2018: The launch of Microsoft Learn was announced on Microsoft Docs.
- November 2018: OneDrive technical documentation moved from TechNet to Microsoft Docs.
- September 2022: The technical documentation from Microsoft Docs was made an item on the Microsoft Learn site.

== See also ==
- Microsoft Learn
- Microsoft Developer Network (MSDN)
- Microsoft TechNet
