= Microsoft Learn =

Microsoft documentation and training library

- Website type: Knowledge base
- Available in: Multiple languages
- Area served: Worldwide
- Owner: Microsoft
- Website: learn.microsoft.com
- IPv6 support: Yes
- Commercial: Yes
- Registration: Optional
- Launched: September 26, 2018; 7 years ago
- Current status: Online

Microsoft Learn is a library of technical documentation and training for end users, developers, and IT professionals who work with Microsoft products. Microsoft Learn was introduced in September 2018. In 2022, Microsoft Docs, the technical documentation library that had replaced MSDN and TechNet in 2016, was moved to Microsoft Learn.

== Structure and features ==
The site's information is organized into seven topic areas:

=== Documentation ===
Originally the separate site Microsoft Docs, this area contains a library of technical instructions and specifications for Microsoft's products. It is organized into over 60 groups based on product or technology, such as .NET, SQL Server, Visual Studio, and Windows.

=== Training ===
This area contains online training modules and courses organized into three areas: Training Paths, Career Paths, and Student Hub. Modules and courses consist of a series of articles that include exercises and are available in beginner, intermediate, and advanced levels. Examples of modules and courses include Introduction to Git, Write your first C# code, and Explore Azure Pipelines.

=== Credentials ===
This area provides information and resources for obtaining Microsoft Certifications and Applied Skills: ways to show objective proof of knowledge and skill in using Microsoft products for career advancement. Available certifications include: Microsoft Certified Educator and Microsoft 365 Certified Administrator Expert

=== Q&A ===
This is a forum for asking and answering questions about Microsoft products and technologies.

=== Code samples ===
Originally the separate site MSDN Gallery, this is a repository of community-authored code samples and projects. Articles containing code samples are organized by product or programming language.

=== Assessments ===
This area provides free self-service online evaluations of business strategies and workloads in administering Microsoft Azure deployments.

=== Shows ===
This is a repository of video programs that cover various topics concerning Microsoft products and technologies.
