= MacMinute =

Apple Macintosh news and information website)

MacMinute was the name of a web site that provided news and information focused on Apple Inc and the Macintosh Operating system. It was founded by Canadian businessman Stan Flack in 2001 to "keep you up-to-date on everything that is going on in the world of Macintosh as soon as it happens". On the opening day, May 9, 2001, the update to the Mac OS X to 10.0.3 was announced.

Prior to creating MacMinute Stan Flack founded the MacCentral news website which he sold to MacWorld on June 1, 1999. This website was eventually folded into the MacWorld brand name and the last vestiges of MacCentral disappeared with the incorporation of the MacCentral Forum into the MacWorld forums in December 2007.

MacMinute was noted for its up to the minute digest of current breaking news about everything connected to the Macintosh and Apple products but one of its more important functions was to serve as a forum for the Macintosh community. This MacMinute Reader Cafe is an eclectic mix of Macintosh users who provide and share expertise in all aspects of the Macintosh platform.

Mr. Flack died of natural causes, from complications to a pre-existing condition, in his home on Prince Edward Island, Canada on April 14, 2008.

On May 22, 2008, the Flack family announced the closing of the Macminute website and forums. Some forum members decide to move to MacCentral Cafe as it reminds them of the single forum Stan Flack started with at the MacCentral news website.

On June 5, 2008 it is announced on the Macminute news site that MacTech's Community News Scan and Macsimum News will act as caretakers to the archives of MacMinute News and Forums. They also announced they would continue to host the MacMinute Forums which are now up and running smoothly as of November 2008. Stan's Lounge is crowded with MacCentral and MacMinute faithful in honor of Stan Flack and all that he did for the Macintosh community.

== Abbreviated MacMinute Chronology ==
- June 1, 1999 MacWorld purchases MacCentral from Canadian businessman Stan Flack.
- May 9, 2001 MacMinute News site is published on the internet by Stan Flack.
- May 19, 2001 MacMinute opens MacMinute Reader Café.
- April 19, 2002 A major influx (more than 30) of MacCentral forum members create user accounts in the MacMinute Reader Café.
- August 4. 2004 MacMinute forum member mikeb_X dies.
- September 2, 2004 A "Political Forum" is created within the MacMinute Reader Café.
- May 14, 2005 Lesh creates the neologism "malacarpism".
- December 16, 2007 With the imminent closing of MacCentral forum another influx of users to MacMinute Café occurs.
- January 3, 2008 The MacCentral Forum becomes read only causing a few more MCF members to become Macminuters.
- April 14, 2008 Stan Flack passes away.
- May 22, 2008 The Flack family announces the closing of Macminute.
- June 5, 2008 MacTech's Community News Scan and Macsimum News announces the hosting of MacMinute Forums as well as archiving of all past MacMinute News.
- November 6, 2008 Neil Ticktin of MacTech announces that the old MacMinute software has been upgraded and the forum moves to new servers as well.
