= Andrew Himes =

American writer and editor

- Born: 1950 (age 75–76); Wheaton, Illinois
- Citizenship: United States
- Occupations: Writer, social activist, technologist
- Spouse: Christine Hintz Himes (until 1990) Alix Wilber (1990-Current)
- Children: 1

Andrew Himes (born 1950) is an American writer and editor. He was the founding executive director of the Charter for Compassion, launched in 2008 by TED.com and Karen Armstrong, with the mission of supporting the emergence of a "global compassion movement". He is the author of The Sword of the Lord: The Roots of Fundamentalism in an American Family. Himes' grandfather was John R. Rice, dean of American fundamentalists for decades until his death in 1980, and mentor to many younger Baptist preachers including Billy Graham and Jerry Falwell, as well as founding editor of The Sword of the Lord newspaper. Himes' great-grandfather, Will Rice, was a preacher, a farmer, and a Texas State senator.

In 1989, Himes was founding editor of MacTech, a journal of Macintosh software development. In 1992, he was founding editor of the Microsoft Developer Network, and then led the first web development project in the history of the company, a project dubbed the MSDN OffRamp, aimed at making articles, resources, and technical information available on the Internet to an audience of software developers. Beginning in 1994 Himes managed Microsoft's platform web team producing the sites for all of Microsoft's operating systems, browsers, development tools, and technologies. After leaving Microsoft, he founded Project Alchemy, a non-profit company providing technology assistance, training, consulting, database and web solutions to hundreds of grassroots organizations working for social justice in the Pacific Northwest.

Himes was co-founder in 2003 of the international movement, Poets Against the War, and produced the 2005 documentary Voices in Wartime an exploration of the trauma of war through the lens of poetry. In 2004, Himes founded Voices Education Project, a web site dedicated to "teaching peace and compassion", now the education program of the Charter for Compassion. In 2008, Himes was a member of the organizing committee for the Seeds of Compassion event in Seattle, WA.

In 2011, Himes published The Sword of the Lord: The Roots of Fundamentalism in an American Family, a history of the growth and development of fundamentalist Christianity over two centuries in the United States. In 2012, Himes was founding director of Charter for Compassion International, a global movement to create compassionate cities and communities.

Since 2017, Himes has been Director of Collective Impact for the Carbon Leadership Forum, a nonprofit organization with the mission of accelerating the transformation of the building sector to radically reduce the greenhouse gas emissions attributed to materials (also known as embodied carbon) used in buildings and infrastructure. CLF works to research, educate, and foster cross-collaboration to bring embodied carbon of buildings and infrastructure down to zero. The organization's vision is of a transformed, decarbonized building industry – better buildings for a better planet.
