= Skylake =

Skylake or Sky Lake may refer to:

- Skylake (microarchitecture), the codename for a processor microarchitecture developed by Intel as the successor to Broadwell
- Skylake (Mysia), a town of ancient Mysia, now in Turkey
- Sky Lake, Florida, US
