= MacCentral =

Apple Macintosh news and information website

MacCentral was a web site that provided news and information covering the Apple Macintosh, originally as an independent entity and later as the news service for Mac Publishing Web sites, including Macworld.com and Playlist, before being subsumed by Macworld's own brand.

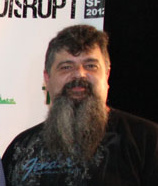
Co-founder Jim Dalrymple

MacCentral was founded by Canadian businessman Stan Flack and Jim Dalrymple as associate editor in 1994. In 1998, MacCentral Online acquired MacGaming. MacCentral Online was purchased by Mac Publishing in 1999. In March 2001, Macworld folded the trade-focused MacWEEK into MacCentral MacCentral was folded into the Macworld brand over a period of several years.

In June 2008 it was announced on the MacMinute news site that MacTech's Community News Scan and Macsimum News will act as caretakers to the archives of MacMinute News and Forums which is where most of Stan's faithful went upon the demise of MacCentral forums. They also announced they would continue to host the MacMinute Forum. Stan's Lounge is crowded with MacCentral and MacMinute faithful in honor of Stan Flack and all that he did for the Macintosh community.

On December 10, 2008 Jim Dalrymple announced that the name MacCentral lives on; with permission from MacWorld, the old MacCentral Forums were opened at www.maccentralforums.com, where eight years of MacCentral forum history could researched. the database of the MacCentral forums has ceased to exist, abbreviated format at archive.gov.

== MacCentral chronology ==
- September 4, 1995 Stan Flack publishes the first monthly issue of MacCentral using DOCMaker.
- June 1999 Mac Publishing, LLC, the publisher of Macworld magazine and Macworld Online, purchases MacCentral Online.
- February 2001 In a move to assert the dominance of the Macworld brand among its brands including MacCentral.com and MacWEEK.com, Mac Publishing redirects Maccentral.com traffic to a subdomain of Macworld.com.
- May 9, 2001 Stan Flack leaves MacCentral to publish MacMinute News on a new web site.
- April 14, 2008, Stan Flack, MacCentral founder, passes away at his home on Prince Edward Island.

== MacCentral Forum ==
Despite the rebranding of MacCentral, a cadre of loyal readers continued to maintain a presence in the MacCentral Forum, a community that remained in operation without being prominently linked to from anywhere on Macworld's primary site. Those forums were shut down in 2008, with many of the forum members relocating to the MacMinute Café forum. And then, with the shutting down of the MacMinute forums in May 2008 the majority of forum members moved to MacCentral Cafe or other places on the internet.

== MacCentral Forum chronology ==
- November 9, 1996 Maccentral in the past
- January 31, 1998 MacCentral Reader Forum opened.
- March 26, 2002 Beginning of what becomes the Forum 2002 Mosaic Project. This community project culminates with posters and signed canvases being sold at Macworld Expo. MacCentral Forum members elect to give the proceeds to United Cerebral Palsy.
- January 16, 2003 Beginning of the thread to create MacCentral Forum Mosaic 2003.
- August 8, 2003 Beginning of the thread to create MacCentral Forum 2004 Mosaic.
- December 14, 2007 Forums integrated into the Macworld website as MacCentral Alumni.
- January 3, 2008 Forums changed to read only.
- March 3, 2008 Forum database made inaccessible by Macworld.
- November, 2008 Stan's Lounge is moved to MacTech servers and quickly becomes a haven for lost MacCentral and MacMinute Forum members.
- December 10, 2008 James Dalrymple announces that the old MacCentral Forums are now in read/write format at www.maccenralforums.com
- April 14, 2009 The anniversary of Stan Flack's death finds the MacCentral/MacMinute forum operating within the MacTech website. Stan's Lounge is still averaging over 300 posts per day.
- October 28, 2010 Polymerase is banned.
