= MacTech =

- Publisher/Editor-in-Chief: Neil Ticktin
- Categories: Computing, Macintosh, programming
- Frequency: Monthly
- Circulation: 35,000 in over 50 countries
- First issue: 1984
- Company: Xplain Corporation
- Country: United States
- Based in: Westlake Village, California
- Language: English
- Website: http://www.mactech.com

MacTech is a monthly magazine for consultants, information technology professionals, system administrators, software developers, and other technical users of the Apple Macintosh line of computers.

The magazine was called "MacTech" for its first two issues, starting in 1984, after which its name was changed to MacTutor. At the time the magazine defined itself as "a technical publication devoted to advancing programming knowledge of the Macintosh for both hacker and professional alike".

In the spring of 1989 a new and separate magazine called MacTech was launched by TechAlliance, a global Apple users group headquartered in Renton, WA that hosted the Apple Programmers and Developers Association (APDA). The founding editor of MacTech was Andrew Himes, and Himes described the magazine as "The journal designed by people who program and develop for the Apple Macintosh. You hold in your hands what is designed to be a legendary publication for a legendary computer. In these wee, early hours of the computer revolution, just a scant half decade after the introduction of Apple's flagship computer, the world needs a magazine that focuses on the needs of the Mac developer community with the intensity, vision, and utility of no other existing publication. Nuts-and-bolts programming solutions and tutorials. In-depth looks at future technologies and present opportunities. An emphasis on both object-oriented and proceduarl languages, on database programming and spreadsheet macros, on HyperTalking and multimedia applications. Feature articles, tutorials, reviews, and commentary by some of the most important, creative, and eloquent programmers in the Macintosh universe. MacTech will be preeminently useful and intellectually provocative. An essential desktop reference for today's serious programmers, as well as a tool that will help pave your way to the future of programming."

In 1993, MacTutor Magazine purchased MacTech, and the name of the consolidated publication became MacTech.

In 2010, MacTech launched its event series—first with MacTech Conference, then MacTech Boot Camp and then MacTech InDepth. 2010 had a single event, 2011 had seven events, and 2012 has fifteen events.

MacTech.com also provides a news aggregator service.

The magazine is privately owned, held by Xplain Corporation.

On June 5, 2008, MacTech announced it would act as caretaker to the archives of MacMinute News and Forums. At these forums, Stan's Lounge is crowded with MacMinute and MacCentral faithful in honor of Stan Flack's contributions to the Macintosh community.

On November 6, 2009, MacTech announced that it was acquiring MacMod, a community site dedicated to modding Apple hardware and software. As part of the acquisition, the MacMod forums have been integrated into MacTech's, and MacTech now has a podcast dedicated to Mac technical topics as well as industry news, event coverage, and interviews.
