= Microsoft TechNet =

Microsoft web portal and web service for IT professionals

- Logo used from 1998 to c. 2006

- Website type: Knowledge base
- Successor: Microsoft Learn
- Owner: Microsoft
- Website: Archived official website at the Wayback Machine (archive index)
- Launched: 1998; 28 years ago
- Current status: offline; subscriptions terminated since August 31, 2013

Microsoft TechNet was a Microsoft web portal and web service for IT professionals. It included a library containing documentation and technical resources for Microsoft products, a learning center providing online training, discussion forums, an evaluation center for downloading trialware, blogs for Microsoft employees and a wiki.

TechNet originally provided a software subscription service similar to Office 365 and Adobe Creative Cloud that allowed subscribers to download Microsoft software under a software as service license for private use. On July 1, 2013, it was announced that Microsoft would be discontinuing the TechNet subscription service, with the purchase and renewal of subscriptions to be closed by August 31, 2013.

TechNet also included a web-based TechNet Magazine which has been discontinued since October 2013. Past issues are still available for reading.

As of January 2020, TechNet redirects to Microsoft Docs.

== Websites ==
TechNet's primary web presence was a collection of sites for IT professionals providing information, documentation, and discussion authored both by Microsoft and by the community at large. Later emphasis on and incorporation of applications such as forums, blogs, library annotations, and social bookmarking changed the nature of the TechNet site from a one-way information service to an open dialog between Microsoft and the IT professional community. The main website and most of its constituent applications below were available in 12 languages, generating traffic from 11.5 million per month and host approx. 11 million documents.

=== Library ===
Similar to the MSDN Library which contained technical information for software developers, the TechNet Library was a source of technical information for IT professionals and advanced users. The technical content was freely available on the web and on CDs and DVDs. The discs were published monthly and contained the complete Microsoft Knowledge Base, service packs, security updates, resource kits, technical training, operations and deployment guides, white papers, and case studies.

In January 2014, Microsoft announced that Microsoft Security Bulletins and Advisories would be merged into the TechNet Library.

In 2016, Microsoft introduced the new technical documentation platform, Microsoft Docs, intended as a replacement of TechNet and MSDN libraries. For the next two years Microsoft migrated their materials into Microsoft Docs. Now most of the TechNet Library pages redirect to the corresponding Microsoft Docs pages.

=== Forums ===
TechNet Forums are the web-based forums used by the community to discuss a wide variety of IT professional topics. TechNet Forums were migrated during 2008 to an all-new platform that provided new features designed to improve efficiency such as inline preview of threads, AJAX filtering, and a slide-up post editor.

=== Blogs ===
TechNet had their own blogging platform, which hosted the blogs of Microsoft employees. In May 2020, the MSDN and TechNet blogs were closed and the content was archived at Microsoft Docs.

=== Wiki ===
The TechNet Wiki is a technical resource inspired by Wikipedia. Wiki is a community site and does not offer official documentation from Microsoft. Anyone who joins the community can contribute new topics, edit and enhance existing topics, provide comments and "friend" other registered users. The goals of the wiki included providing broader and more in-depth solutions content (how-to, procedural, troubleshooting, deployment), from a broad pool of first-hand experiences, with less publishing friction than traditional mechanisms.

=== Other ===
TechNet content on related topics is organized into separate sections, such as:

- TechNet Evaluation Center
- Microsoft Tech Companion App
- Microsoft Script Center
- TechNet Video

=== Social bookmarking ===
Social bookmarking on TechNet Social was first launched in 2008, built on a new web platform that has user-tagging and feeds at its core. The goal of the social bookmarking application is to provide a method whereby members of the IT professional community can:

- Contribute to a database of quality links on any topic from across the web. By filtering on one or more tags, (e.g. "Exchange" and "security") users can discover popular or recent links and subscribe to a feed of those links.
- Find and follow experts' recommended sites. Each profile page includes a feed of the user's contributions. Users can be discovered through a drop-down menu on each bookmark.
- Demonstrate their expertise through the links displayed in their profile.
- Store their favorite links online.

The initial release of the application provides standard features for the genre, including a bookmarklet and import capabilities. The TechNet web site is also starting to incorporate feeds of social bookmarks from experts and the community, displayed alongside feeds from relevant bloggers.

=== Subscriptions and downloads ===
TechNet also provided access to Microsoft software for evaluation purposes through the "TechNet subscription". The annual subscription provided trial-use-only software that was unlocked only so long as a subscription was maintained. The Standard subscription provided access to most of their software except specific enterprise-oriented software and included one collection of Microsoft E-learning. The Professional subscription was more expensive and provided access to all their software and included two free professional support calls and two collections of Microsoft E-learning.

On July 1, 2013, Microsoft announced the retirement of the TechNet Subscriptions service to focus on growing its free offerings, including evaluation resources through the TechNet Evaluation Center, expert-led learning through the Microsoft Virtual Academy, and community-moderated technical support through the TechNet Forums to better meet the needs of the growing IT professional community. The last day to purchase a TechNet Subscription was August 31, 2013. Subscribers could activate purchased subscriptions through September 30, 2013.

Microsoft announced an extended 90-days plan to help existing subscribers get used to the new situation.

== TechNet Magazine ==
Founded in 2005, TechNet Magazine is a discontinued monthly print magazine that provided IT professionals, working with Microsoft technologies, information about planning, operating, and optimizing their systems. At the time it was discontinued, TechNet Magazine had a print circulation of about 100,000 readers in the US.

== See also ==
- Microsoft Developer Network
- Microsoft Docs
