= DotGNU =

Open-source implementation of .NET Framework

- Developers: Rhys Weatherly (Southern Storm Software Pty), Klaus Treichel, Thong Nguyen, Gopal V, Norbert Bollow
- Final release: 0.8.0 / March 20, 2007; 19 years ago
- Written in: C, C#
- Operating system: Linux, BSD, Mac OS X, Solaris, AIX, Microsoft Windows, others
- Type: System platform
- License: GPL and LGPL
- Website: www.dotgnu.org

DotGNU is a decommissioned part of the GNU Project that started in January 2001 and aimed to provide a free software replacement for Microsoft's .NET Framework. The DotGNU project was run by the Free Software Foundation. Other goals of the project are better support for non-Windows platforms and support for more processors.

The main goal of the DotGNU project code base was to provide a class library that is 100% Common Language Specification (CLS) compliant.

== Main development projects ==
=== Portable.NET ===
DotGNU Portable.NET, an implementation of the ECMA-335 Common Language Infrastructure (CLI), includes software to compile and run Visual Basic .NET, C#, and C applications that use the .NET base class libraries, XML, and Windows Forms. Portable.NET claims to support various instruction set architectures including x86, PPC, ARM, and SPARC.

=== DGEE ===
DotGNU Execution Environment (DGEE) is a web service server.

=== libJIT ===
libJIT is a just-in-time compilation library for development of advanced just-in-time compilation in virtual machine implementations, dynamic programming languages, and scripting languages. It implements an intermediate representation based on three-address code, in which variables are kept in static single assignment form.

libJIT has also seen some use in other open source projects, including GNU Emacs, ILDJIT and HornetsEye.

== Framework architecture ==
Simplified Mono architecture

The Portable .NET class library seeks to provide facilities for application development. These are primarily written in C#, but because of the Common Language Specification they can be used by any .NET language. Like .NET, the class library is structured into Namespaces and Assemblies. It has additional top-level namespaces including Accessibility and DotGNU. In a typical operation, the Portable .NET compiler generates a Common Language Specification (CLS) image, as specified in chapter 6 of ECMA-335, and the Portable .NET runtime takes this image and runs it.

== Free software ==
DotGNU points out that it is Free Software, and it sets out to ensure that all aspects of DotGNU minimize dependence on proprietary components, such as calls to Microsoft Windows' GUI code. DotGNU was one of the High Priority Free Software Projects from July 31, 2007 till October 2, 2008.

== DotGNU and Microsoft's patents ==
DotGNU's implementation of those components of the .NET stack not submitted to the ECMA for standardization has been the source of patent violation concerns for much of the life of the project. In particular, discussion has taken place about whether Microsoft could destroy the DotGNU project through patent suits.

The base technologies submitted to the ECMA may be non-problematic. The concerns primarily relate to technologies developed by Microsoft on top of the .NET Framework, such as ASP.NET, ADO.NET, and Windows Forms (see Non standardized namespaces), i.e. parts composing DotGNU's Windows compatibility stack. These technologies are today not fully implemented in DotGNU and are not required for developing DotGNU-applications.

In 2009, Microsoft released .NET Micro Framework under Apache License, Version 2.0, which includes a patent grant. However, the .NET Micro Framework is a reimplementation of the CLR and limited subset of the base class libraries meant for use on embedded devices. Additionally, the patent grant in the Apache License would have protected only contributors and users of the .NET Micro Framework—not users and developers of alternative implementations such as DotGNU or Mono.

In 2014, Microsoft released Roslyn, the next generation official Microsoft C# compiler, under the Apache License. Later that year, Microsoft announced a "reboot" of the official .NET Framework. The framework would be based on .NET Core, including the official runtime and standard libraries released under the MIT License and a patent grant explicitly protecting recipients from Microsoft-owned patents regarding .NET Core.

== See also ==
- Comparison of application virtual machines
- Portable.NET – A portable version of DotGNU toolchain and runtime
- Mono – A popular free software implementation of Microsoft's .NET
- Common Language Runtime
- Shared Source Common Language Infrastructure – Microsoft's shared source implementation of .NET, previously codenamed Rotor
