= LINQPad =

- Original author: Joseph Albahari
- Stable release: 9.6.6
- Written in: C#
- Operating system: Windows
- Platform: .NET
- Available in: English
- Type: Developer utility
- License: Freemium
- Website: www.linqpad.net

LINQPad is a software utility targeted at .NET Framework and .NET Core development. It is used to interactively query SQL databases (among other data sources such as OData or WCF Data Services) using LINQ, as well as interactively writing C# code without the need for an IDE. This expands its use to a general "test workbench" where C# code can be quickly prototyped outside of Visual Studio. It can also be used to write code in the VB.NET, SQL and F# languages.

This product is freemium, keeping the C# auto-complete feature disabled until the user purchases a license.

LINQPad supports the following LINQ dialects:

- Entity Framework
- LINQ to Objects
- LINQ to SQL
- LINQ to XML
