= List of data types of the Standard Libraries =

This is a list of data types of the Standard Libraries as defined in the ECMA-335 standard. Implementations of the Common Language Infrastructure must define the types of the standard in their respective standard libraries. The standard encourages implementers to extend or to modify the types specified in the standard to provide additional functionality.

== List ==
=== Base Class Library ===
Name	Namespace	Base type	CIL type	Assembly name	Assembly version
Action	System	System.MulticastDelegate	delegate	mscorlib	4.0.0.0
Action<T>	System	System.MulticastDelegate	delegate	mscorlib	4.0.0.0
Action<T1, T2>	System	System.MulticastDelegate	delegate	mscorlib	4.0.0.0
Action<T1, T2, T3>	System	System.MulticastDelegate	delegate	mscorlib	4.0.0.0
Action<T1, T2, T3, T4>	System	System.MulticastDelegate	delegate	mscorlib	4.0.0.0
Action<T1, T2, T3, T4, T5>	System	System.MulticastDelegate	delegate	mscorlib	4.0.0.0
Action<T1, T2, T3, T4, T5, T6>	System	System.MulticastDelegate	delegate	mscorlib	4.0.0.0
Action<T1, T2, T3, T4, T5, T6, T7>	System	System.MulticastDelegate	delegate	mscorlib	4.0.0.0
Action<T1, T2, T3, T4, T5, T6, T7, T8>	System	System.MulticastDelegate	delegate	mscorlib	4.0.0.0
ApplicationException	System	System.Exception	class	mscorlib	2.0.x.x
ArgumentException	System	System.SystemException	class	mscorlib	2.0.x.x
ArgumentNullException	System	System.ArgumentException	class	mscorlib	2.0.x.x
ArgumentOutOfRangeException	System	System.ArgumentException	class	mscorlib	2.0.x.x
ArithmeticException	System	System.SystemException	class	mscorlib	2.0.x.x
Array	System	System.Object	class	mscorlib	2.0.x.x
ArrayList	System.Collections	System.Object	class	mscorlib	2.0.x.x
ArrayTypeMismatchException	System	System.SystemException	class	mscorlib	2.0.x.x
ASCIIEncoding	System.Text	System.Text.Encoding	class	mscorlib	2.0.x.x
AsyncCallback	System	System.Delegate	delegate	mscorlib	2.0.x.x
Attribute	System	System.Object	class	mscorlib	2.0.x.x
AttributeTargets	System	System.Enum	enumeration	mscorlib	2.0.x.x
AttributeUsageAttribute	System	System.Attribute	class	mscorlib	2.0.x.x
AutoResetEvent	System.Threading	System.Threading.EventWaitHandle	class	mscorlib	4.0.0.0
Boolean	System	System.ValueType	structure	mscorlib	2.0.x.x
Byte	System	System.ValueType	structure	mscorlib	2.0.x.x
Char	System	System.ValueType	structure	mscorlib	2.0.x.x
CharEnumerator	System	System.Object	class	mscorlib	2.0.x.x
CLSCompliantAttribute	System	System.Attribute	class	mscorlib	2.0.x.x
CodeAccessPermission	System.Security	System.Object	class	mscorlib	2.0.x.x
CodeAccessSecurityAttribute	System.Security.Permissions	System.Security.Permissions.SecurityAttribute	class	mscorlib	2.0.x.x
Comparer	System.Collections	System.Object	class	mscorlib	2.0.x.x
Comparer<T>	System.Collections.Generic	System.Object	class	mscorlib	4.0.0.0
Comparison<T>	System	System.MulticastDelegate	delegate	mscorlib	4.0.0.0
ConditionalAttribute	System.Diagnostics	System.Attribute	class	mscorlib	2.0.x.x
Console	System	System.Object	class	mscorlib	2.0.x.x
Convert	System	System.Object	class	mscorlib	2.0.x.x
Converter<TInput, TOutput>	System	System.MulticastDelegate	delegate	mscorlib	4.0.0.0
DateTime	System	System.ValueType	structure	mscorlib	2.0.x.x
DateTimeFormatInfo	System.Globalization	System.Object	class	mscorlib	2.0.x.x
DateTimeStyles	System.Globalization	System.Enum	enumeration	mscorlib	2.0.x.x
DBNull	System	System.Object	class	mscorlib	4.0.0.0
Decoder	System.Text	System.Object	class	mscorlib	2.0.x.x
Delegate	System	System.Object	class	mscorlib	2.0.x.x
Dictionary<TKey, TValue>	System.Collections.Generic	System.Object	class	mscorlib	2.0.x.x
Dictionary<TKey, TValue>.Enumerator	System.Collections.Generic	System.ValueType	structure	mscorlib	2.0.x.x
Dictionary<TKey, TValue>.KeyCollection	System.Collections.Generic	System.Object	class	mscorlib	2.0.x.x
Dictionary<TKey, TValue>.KeyCollection.Enumerator	System.Collections.Generic	System.ValueType	structure	mscorlib	2.0.x.x
Dictionary<TKey, TValue>.ValueCollection	System.Collections.Generic	System.Object	class	mscorlib	2.0.x.x
Dictionary<TKey, TValue>.ValueCollection.Enumerator	System.Collections.Generic	System.ValueType	structure	mscorlib	2.0.x.x
DictionaryEntry	System.Collections	System.ValueType	structure	mscorlib	2.0.x.x
Directory	System.IO	System.Object	class	mscorlib	2.0.x.x
DirectoryNotFoundException	System.IO	System.IO.IOException	class	mscorlib	2.0.x.x
DivideByZeroException	System	System.ArithmeticException	class	mscorlib	2.0.x.x
DuplicateWaitObjectException	System	System.ArgumentException	class	mscorlib	2.0.x.x
Encoder	System.Text	System.Object	class	mscorlib	2.0.x.x
Encoding	System.Text	System.Object	class	mscorlib	2.0.x.x
EndOfStreamException	System.IO	System.IO.IOException	class	mscorlib	2.0.x.x
Enum	System	System.ValueType	structure	mscorlib	2.0.x.x
Environment	System	System.Object	class	mscorlib	2.0.x.x
EnvironmentPermission	System.Security.Permissions	System.Security.CodeAccessPermission	class	mscorlib	2.0.x.x
EnvironmentPermissionAccess	System.Security.Permissions	System.Enum	enumeration	mscorlib	2.0.x.x
EnvironmentPermissionAttribute	System.Security.Permissions	System.Security.Permissions.CodeAccessSecurityAttribute	class	mscorlib	2.0.x.x
EqualityComparer<T>	System.Collections.Generic	System.Object	class	mscorlib	4.0.0.0
EventArgs	System	System.Object	class	mscorlib	2.0.x.x
EventHandler	System	System.Delegate	delegate	mscorlib	2.0.x.x
EventResetMode	System.Threading	System.Enum	enumeration	mscorlib	4.0.0.0
EventWaitHandle	System.Threading	System.Threading.WaitHandle	class	mscorlib	4.0.0.0
Exception	System	System.Object	class	mscorlib	2.0.x.x
ExecutionEngineException	System	System.SystemException	class	mscorlib	2.0.x.x
File	System.IO	System.Object	class	mscorlib	2.0.x.x
FileAccess	System.IO	System.Enum	enumeration	mscorlib	2.0.x.x
FileIOPermissionAccess	System.Security.Permissions	System.Enum	enumeration	mscorlib	2.0.x.x
FileIOPermissionAttribute	System.Security.Permissions	System.Security.Permissions.CodeAccessSecurityAttribute	class	mscorlib	2.0.x.x
FileLoadException	System.IO	System.IO.IOException	class	mscorlib	2.0.x.x
FileMode	System.IO	System.Enum	enumeration	mscorlib	2.0.x.x
FileNotFoundException	System.IO	System.IO.IOException	class	mscorlib	2.0.x.x
FileShare	System.IO	System.Enum	enumeration	mscorlib	2.0.x.x
FileStream	System.IO	System.IO.Stream	class	mscorlib	2.0.x.x
FlagsAttribute	System	System.Attribute	class	mscorlib	2.0.x.x
FormatException	System	System.SystemException	class	mscorlib	2.0.x.x
Func<TResult>	System	System.MulticastDelegate	delegate	mscorlib	4.0.0.0
Func<T, TResult>	System	System.MulticastDelegate	delegate	mscorlib	4.0.0.0
Func<T1, T2, TResult>	System	System.MulticastDelegate	delegate	mscorlib	4.0.0.0
Func<T1, T2, T3, TResult>	System	System.MulticastDelegate	delegate	mscorlib	4.0.0.0
Func<T1, T2, T3, T4, TResult>	System	System.MulticastDelegate	delegate	mscorlib	4.0.0.0
Func<T1, T2, T3, T4, T5, TResult>	System	System.MulticastDelegate	delegate	mscorlib	4.0.0.0
Func<T1, T2, T3, T4, T5, T6, TResult>	System	System.MulticastDelegate	delegate	mscorlib	4.0.0.0
Func<T1, T2, T3, T4, T5, T6, T7, TResult>	System	System.MulticastDelegate	delegate	mscorlib	4.0.0.0
Func<T1, T2, T3, T4, T5, T6, T7, T8, TResult>	System	System.MulticastDelegate	delegate	mscorlib	4.0.0.0
GC	System	System.Object	class	mscorlib	2.0.x.x
Guid	System	System.ValueType	structure	mscorlib	4.0.0.0
Hashtable	System.Collections	System.Object	class	mscorlib	2.0.x.x
IAsyncResult	System	none	interface	mscorlib	2.0.x.x
ICloneable	System	none	interface	mscorlib	2.0.x.x
ICollection	System.Collections	none	interface	mscorlib	2.0.x.x
ICollection<T>	System.Collections.Generic	none	interface	mscorlib	2.0.x.x
IComparable	System	none	interface	mscorlib	2.0.x.x
IComparable<T>	System	none	interface	mscorlib	4.0.0.0
IComparer	System.Collections	none	interface	mscorlib	2.0.x.x
IComparer<T>	System.Collections.Generic	none	interface	mscorlib	4.0.0.0
IDictionary	System.Collections	none	interface	mscorlib	2.0.x.x
IDictionary<TKey, TValue>	System.Collections.Generic	none	interface	mscorlib	2.0.x.x
IDictionaryEnumerator	System.Collections	none	interface	mscorlib	2.0.x.x
IDisposable	System	none	interface	mscorlib	2.0.x.x
IEnumerable	System.Collections	none	interface	mscorlib	2.0.x.x
IEnumerable<T>	System.Collections.Generic	none	interface	mscorlib	4.0.0.0
IEnumerator	System.Collections	none	interface	mscorlib	2.0.x.x
IEnumerator<T>	System.Collections.Generic	none	interface	mscorlib	2.0.x.x
IEqualityComparer<T>	System.Collections.Generic	none	interface	mscorlib	4.0.0.0
IEquatable<T>	System	none	interface	mscorlib	2.0.x.x
IFormatProvider	System	none	interface	mscorlib	2.0.x.x
IFormattable	System	none	interface	mscorlib	2.0.x.x
IHashCodeProvider	System.Collections	none	interface	mscorlib	2.0.x.x
IList	System.Collections	none	interface	mscorlib	2.0.x.x
IList<T>	System.Collections.Generic	none	interface	mscorlib	2.0.x.x
IndexOutOfRangeException	System	System.SystemException	class	mscorlib	2.0.x.x
Int16	System	System.ValueType	structure	mscorlib	2.0.x.x
Int32	System	System.ValueType	structure	mscorlib	2.0.x.x
Int64	System	System.ValueType	structure	mscorlib	2.0.x.x
Interlocked	System.Threading	System.Object	class	mscorlib	2.0.x.x
INullableValue	System	none	interface	mscorlib	2.0.x.x
InvalidCastException	System	System.SystemException	class	mscorlib	2.0.x.x
InvalidOperationException	System	System.SystemException	class	mscorlib	2.0.x.x
InvalidProgramException	System	System.SystemException	class	mscorlib	2.0.x.x
IOException	System.IO	System.SystemException	class	mscorlib	2.0.x.x
IPermission	System.Security	none	interface	mscorlib	2.0.x.x
ISet<T>	System.Collections.Generic	none	interface	System	4.0.0.0
KeyNotFoundException	System.Collections.Generic	System.SystemException	class	mscorlib	2.0.x.x
KeyValuePair<K, V>	System.Collections.Generic	System.ValueType	structure	mscorlib	2.0.x.x
LinkedList<T>	System.Collections.Generic	System.Object	class	System	4.0.0.0
LinkedList<T>.Enumerator	System.Collections.Generic	System.ValueType	structure	System	4.0.0.0
LinkedListNode<T>	System.Collections.Generic	System.Object	class	System	4.0.0.0
List<T>	System.Collections.Generic	System.Object	class	mscorlib	2.0.x.x
List<T>.Enumerator	System.Collections.Generic	System.ValueType	structure	mscorlib	2.0.x.x
ManualResetEvent	System.Threading	System.Threading.EventWaitHandle	class	mscorlib	4.0.0.0
MarshalByRefObject	System	System.Object	class	mscorlib	2.0.x.x
MemoryStream	System.IO	System.IO.Stream	class	mscorlib	2.0.x.x
Monitor	System.Threading	System.Object	class	mscorlib	2.0.x.x
MulticastDelegate	System	System.Delegate	delegate	mscorlib	4.0.0.0
NotImplementedException	System	System.SystemException	class	mscorlib	2.0.x.x
NotSupportedException	System	System.SystemException	class	mscorlib	2.0.x.x
Nullable<T>	System	System.ValueType	structure	mscorlib	2.0.x.x
NullReferenceException	System	System.SystemException	class	mscorlib	2.0.x.x
NumberFormatInfo	System.Globalization	System.Object	class	mscorlib	2.0.x.x
NumberStyles	System.Globalization	System.Enum	enumeration	mscorlib	2.0.x.x
Object	System	root	class	mscorlib	2.0.x.x
ObjectDisposedException	System	System.InvalidOperationException	class	mscorlib	2.0.x.x
ObsoleteAttribute	System	System.Attribute	class	mscorlib	2.0.x.x
OutOfMemoryException	System	System.SystemException	class	mscorlib	2.0.x.x
OverflowException	System	System.ArithmeticException	class	mscorlib	2.0.x.x
Path	System.IO	System.Object	class	mscorlib	2.0.x.x
PathTooLongException	System.IO	System.IO.IOException	class	mscorlib	2.0.x.x
PermissionSet	System.Security	System.Object	class	mscorlib	2.0.x.x
PermissionState	System.Security.Permissions	System.Enum	enumeration	mscorlib	2.0.x.x
Predicate<T>	System	System.MulticastDelegate	delegate	mscorlib	4.0.0.0
Queue<T>	System.Collections.Generic	System.Object	class	System	4.0.0.0
Random	System	System.Object	class	mscorlib	2.0.x.x
RankException	System	System.SystemException	class	mscorlib	2.0.x.x
SByte	System	System.ValueType	structure	mscorlib	2.0.x.x
SecurityAction	System.Security.Permissions	System.Enum	enumeration	mscorlib	2.0.x.x
SecurityAttribute	System.Security.Permissions	System.Attribute	class	mscorlib	2.0.x.x
SecurityElement	System.Security	System.Object	class	mscorlib	2.0.x.x
SecurityException	System.Security	System.SystemException	class	mscorlib	2.0.x.x
SecurityPermission	System.Security.Permissions	System.Security.CodeAccessPermission	class	mscorlib	2.0.x.x
SecurityPermissionAttribute	System.Security.Permissions	System.Security.Permissions.CodeAccessSecurityAttribute	class	mscorlib	2.0.x.x
SecurityPermissionFlag	System.Security.Permissions	System.Enum	enumeration	mscorlib	2.0.x.x
SeekOrigin	System.IO	System.Enum	enumeration	mscorlib	2.0.x.x
Stack	System.Collections	System.Object	class	mscorlib	4.0.0.0
Stack<T>.Enumerator	System.Collections.Generic	System.ValueType	structure	System	4.0.0.0
Stack<T>	System.Collections.Generic	System.Object	class	System	4.0.0.0
StackOverflowException	System	System.SystemException	class	mscorlib	2.0.x.x
Stream	System.IO	System.MarshalByRefObject	class	mscorlib	2.0.x.x
StreamReader	System.IO	System.IO.TextReader	class	mscorlib	2.0.x.x
StreamWriter	System.IO	System.IO.TextWriter	class	mscorlib	2.0.x.x
String	System	System.Object	class	mscorlib	2.0.x.x
StringBuilder	System.Text	System.Object	class	mscorlib	2.0.x.x
StringReader	System.IO	System.IO.TextReader	class	mscorlib	2.0.x.x
StringWriter	System.IO	System.IO.TextWriter	class	mscorlib	2.0.x.x
SynchronizationLockException	System.Threading	System.SystemException	class	mscorlib	2.0.x.x
SystemException	System	System.Exception	class	mscorlib	2.0.x.x
TextReader	System.IO	System.MarshalByRefObject	class	mscorlib	2.0.x.x
TextWriter	System.IO	System.MarshalByRefObject	class	mscorlib	2.0.x.x
Thread	System.Threading	System.Object	class	mscorlib	2.0.x.x
ThreadAbortException	System.Threading	System.SystemException	class	mscorlib	2.0.x.x
ThreadPriority	System.Threading	System.Enum	enumeration	mscorlib	2.0.x.x
ThreadStart	System.Threading	System.Delegate	delegate	mscorlib	2.0.x.x
ThreadState	System.Threading	System.Enum	enumeration	mscorlib	2.0.x.x
ThreadStateException	System.Threading	System.SystemException	class	mscorlib	2.0.x.x
ThreadStaticAttribute	System	System.Attribute	class	mscorlib	2.0.x.x
Timeout	System.Threading	System.Object	class	mscorlib	2.0.x.x
Timer	System.Threading	System.MarshalByRefObject	class	mscorlib	2.0.x.x
TimerCallback	System.Threading	System.Delegate	delegate	mscorlib	2.0.x.x
TimeSpan	System	System.ValueType	structure	mscorlib	2.0.x.x
Type	System	System.Object	class	mscorlib	2.0.x.x
TypeInitializationException	System	System.SystemException	class	mscorlib	2.0.x.x
UInt16	System	System.ValueType	structure	mscorlib	2.0.x.x
UInt32	System	System.ValueType	structure	mscorlib	2.0.x.x
UInt64	System	System.ValueType	structure	mscorlib	2.0.x.x
UnauthorizedAccessException	System	System.SystemException	class	mscorlib	2.0.x.x
UnicodeCategory	System.Globalization	System.Enum	enumeration	mscorlib	2.0.x.x
UnicodeEncoding	System.Text	System.Text.Encoding	class	mscorlib	2.0.x.x
UTF8Encoding	System.Text	System.Text.Encoding	class	mscorlib	2.0.x.x
ValueType	System	System.Object	class	mscorlib	2.0.x.x
VerificationException	System.Security	System.SystemException	class	mscorlib	2.0.x.x
Version	System	System.Object	class	mscorlib	2.0.x.x
WaitHandle	System.Threading	System.MarshalByRefObject	class	mscorlib	2.0.x.x
WeakReference	System	System.Object	class	mscorlib	4.0.0.0

=== Runtime Infrastructure Library ===
Name	Namespace	Base type	CIL type	Assembly name	Assembly version
AppDomain	System	System.MarshalByRefObject	class	mscorlib	2.0.x.x
Assembly	System.Reflection	System.Object	class	mscorlib	2.0.x.x
AssemblyLoadEventArgs	System	System.EventArgs	class	mscorlib	2.0.x.x
AssemblyLoadEventHandler	System	System.Delegate	delegate	mscorlib	2.0.x.x
BadImageFormatException	System	System.SystemException	class	mscorlib	2.0.x.x
CallingConvention	System.Runtime.InteropServices	System.Enum	enumeration	mscorlib	2.0.x.x
CallingConventions	System.Reflection	System.Enum	enumeration	mscorlib	4.0.0.0
CannotUnloadAppDomainException	System	System.SystemException	class	mscorlib	2.0.x.x
CharSet	System.Runtime.InteropServices	System.Enum	enumeration	mscorlib	2.0.x.x
CompilationRelaxations	System.Runtime.CompilerServices	System.Enum	enumeration	mscorlib	2.0.x.x
CompilationRelaxationsAttribute	System.Runtime.CompilerServices	System.Attribute	class	mscorlib	2.0.x.x
DecimalConstantAttribute	System.Runtime.CompilerServices	System.Attribute	class	mscorlib	2.0.x.x
DefaultMemberAttribute	System.Reflection	System.Attribute	class	mscorlib	2.0.x.x
DllImportAttribute	System.Runtime.InteropServices	System.Attribute	class	mscorlib	2.0.x.x
EntryPointNotFoundException	System	System.TypeLoadException	class	mscorlib	2.0.x.x
FieldAccessException	System	System.MemberAccessException	class	mscorlib	2.0.x.x
FieldOffsetAttribute	System.Runtime.InteropServices	System.Attribute	class	mscorlib	2.0.x.x
GCHandle	System.Runtime.InteropServices	System.ValueType	structure	mscorlib	2.0.x.x
GCHandleType	System.Runtime.InteropServices	System.Enum	enumeration	mscorlib	2.0.x.x
GuidAttribute	System.Runtime.InteropServices	System.Attribute	class	mscorlib	4.0.0.0
InAttribute	System.Runtime.InteropServices	System.Attribute	class	mscorlib	2.0.x.x
IndexerNameAttribute	System.Runtime.CompilerServices	System.Attribute	class	mscorlib	2.0.x.x
IntPtr	System	System.ValueType	structure	mscorlib	2.0.x.x
IsVolatile	System.Runtime.CompilerServices	System.Object	class	mscorlib	2.0.x.x
LayoutKind	System.Runtime.InteropServices	System.Enum	enumeration	mscorlib	2.0.x.x
Marshal	System.Runtime.InteropServices	System.Object	class	mscorlib	4.0.0.0
MarshalAsAttribute	System.Runtime.InteropServices	System.Attribute	class	mscorlib	2.0.x.x
MemberAccessException	System	System.SystemException	class	mscorlib	2.0.x.x
MethodAccessException	System	System.MemberAccessException	class	mscorlib	2.0.x.x
MethodImplAttribute	System.Runtime.CompilerServices	System.Attribute	class	mscorlib	2.0.x.x
MethodImplOptions	System.Runtime.CompilerServices	System.Enum	enumeration	mscorlib	2.0.x.x
MissingFieldException	System	System.MissingMemberException	class	mscorlib	2.0.x.x
MissingMemberException	System	System.MemberAccessException	class	mscorlib	2.0.x.x
MissingMethodException	System	System.MissingMemberException	class	mscorlib	2.0.x.x
OutAttribute	System.Runtime.InteropServices	System.Attribute	class	mscorlib	2.0.x.x
ParamArrayAttribute	System	System.Attribute	class	mscorlib	2.0.x.x
RuntimeFieldHandle	System	System.ValueType	structure	mscorlib	2.0.x.x
RuntimeHelpers	System.Runtime.CompilerServices	System.Object	class	mscorlib	2.0.x.x
RuntimeMethodHandle	System	System.ValueType	structure	mscorlib	2.0.x.x
RuntimeTypeHandle	System	System.ValueType	structure	mscorlib	2.0.x.x
SafeBuffer	System.Runtime.InteropServices	System.Runtime.InteropServices.SafeHandle	class	mscorlib	4.0.0.0
SafeHandle	System.Runtime.InteropServices	System.Object	class	mscorlib	4.0.0.0
StructLayoutAttribute	System.Runtime.InteropServices	System.Attribute	class	mscorlib	2.0.x.x
TypeForwardedFromAttribute	System.Runtime.CompilerServices	none	interface	mscorlib	4.0.0.0
TypeForwardedToAttribute	System.Runtime.CompilerServices	System.Attribute	class	mscorlib	4.0.0.0
TypeLoadException	System	System.SystemException	class	mscorlib	2.0.x.x
TypeUnloadedException	System	System.SystemException	class	mscorlib	2.0.x.x
UIntPtr	System	System.ValueType	structure	mscorlib	2.0.x.x
UnhandledExceptionEventArgs	System	System.EventArgs	class	mscorlib	2.0.x.x
UnhandledExceptionEventHandler	System	System.Delegate	delegate	mscorlib	2.0.x.x
UnmanagedType	System.Runtime.InteropServices	System.Enum	enumeration	mscorlib	2.0.x.x

=== Network Library ===
Name	Namespace	Base type	CIL type	Assembly name	Assembly version
AddressFamily	System.Net.Sockets	System.Enum	enumeration	System	2.0.x.x
AuthenticationManager	System.Net	System.Object	class	System	2.0.x.x
Authorization	System.Net	System.Object	class	System	2.0.x.x
CredentialCache	System.Net	System.Object	class	System	2.0.x.x
Dns	System.Net	System.Object	class	System	2.0.x.x
DnsPermission	System.Net	System.Security.CodeAccessPermission	class	System	2.0.x.x
DnsPermissionAttribute	System.Net	System.Security.Permissions.CodeAccessSecurityAttribute	class	System	2.0.x.x
EndPoint	System.Net	System.Object	class	System	2.0.x.x
GlobalProxySelection	System.Net	System.Object	class	System	2.0.x.x
HttpContinueDelegate	System.Net	System.Delegate	delegate	System	2.0.x.x
HttpStatusCode	System.Net	System.Enum	enumeration	System	2.0.x.x
HttpVersion	System.Net	System.Object	class	System	2.0.x.x
HttpWebRequest	System.Net	System.Net.WebRequest	class	System	2.0.x.x
HttpWebResponse	System.Net	System.Net.WebResponse	class	System	2.0.x.x
IAuthenticationModule	System.Net	none	interface	System	2.0.x.x
ICredentials	System.Net	none	interface	System	2.0.x.x
IPAddress	System.Net	System.Object	class	System	2.0.x.x
IPEndPoint	System.Net	System.Net.EndPoint	class	System	2.0.x.x
IPHostEntry	System.Net	System.Object	class	System	2.0.x.x
IWebProxy	System.Net	none	interface	System	2.0.x.x
IWebRequestCreate	System.Net	none	interface	System	2.0.x.x
LingerOption	System.Net.Sockets	System.Object	class	System	2.0.x.x
MulticastOption	System.Net.Sockets	System.Object	class	System	2.0.x.x
NameValueCollection	System.Collections.Specialized	System.Object	class	System	2.0.x.x
NetworkAccess	System.Net	System.Enum	enumeration	System	2.0.x.x
NetworkCredential	System.Net	System.Object	class	System	2.0.x.x
NetworkStream	System.Net.Sockets	System.IO.Stream	class	System	2.0.x.x
ProtocolType	System.Net.Sockets	System.Enum	enumeration	System	2.0.x.x
ProtocolViolationException	System.Net	System.InvalidOperationException	class	System	2.0.x.x
SelectMode	System.Net.Sockets	System.Enum	enumeration	System	2.0.x.x
ServicePoint	System.Net	System.Object	class	System	2.0.x.x
ServicePointManager	System.Net	System.Object	class	System	2.0.x.x
Socket	System.Net.Sockets	System.Object	class	System	2.0.x.x
SocketAddress	System.Net	System.Object	class	System	2.0.x.x
SocketException	System.Net.Sockets	System.SystemException	class	System	2.0.x.x
SocketFlags	System.Net.Sockets	System.Enum	enumeration	System	2.0.x.x
SocketOptionLevel	System.Net.Sockets	System.Enum	enumeration	System	2.0.x.x
SocketOptionName	System.Net.Sockets	System.Enum	enumeration	System	2.0.x.x
SocketPermission	System.Net	System.Security.CodeAccessPermission	class	System	2.0.x.x
SocketPermissionAttribute	System.Net	System.Security.Permissions.CodeAccessSecurityAttribute	class	System	2.0.x.x
SocketShutdown	System.Net.Sockets	System.Enum	enumeration	System	2.0.x.x
SocketType	System.Net.Sockets	System.Enum	enumeration	System	2.0.x.x
TransportType	System.Net	System.Enum	enumeration	System	2.0.x.x
Uri	System	System.Object	class	System	2.0.x.x
UriBuilder	System	System.Object	class	System	2.0.x.x
UriFormatException	System	System.FormatException	class	System	2.0.x.x
UriHostNameType	System	System.Enum	enumeration	System	2.0.x.x
UriPartial	System	System.Enum	enumeration	System	2.0.x.x
WebClient	System.Net	System.MarshalByRefObject	class	System	2.0.x.x
WebException	System.Net	System.InvalidOperationException	class	System	2.0.x.x
WebExceptionStatus	System.Net	System.Enum	enumeration	System	2.0.x.x
WebHeaderCollection	System.Net	System.Collections.Specialized.NameValueCollection	class	System	2.0.x.x
WebPermission	System.Net	System.Security.CodeAccessPermission	class	System	2.0.x.x
WebPermissionAttribute	System.Net	System.Security.Permissions.CodeAccessSecurityAttribute	class	System	2.0.x.x
WebProxy	System.Net	System.Object	class	System	2.0.x.x
WebRequest	System.Net	System.MarshalByRefObject	class	System	2.0.x.x
WebResponse	System.Net	System.MarshalByRefObject	class	System	2.0.x.x

=== Reflection Library ===
Name	Namespace	Base type	CIL type	Assembly name	Assembly version
AmbiguousMatchException	System.Reflection	System.SystemException	class	mscorlib	2.0.x.x
Binder	System.Reflection	System.Object	class	mscorlib	2.0.x.x
BindingFlags	System.Reflection	System.Enum	enumeration	mscorlib	2.0.x.x
ConstructorInfo	System.Reflection	System.Reflection.MethodBase	class	mscorlib	2.0.x.x
CultureInfo	System.Globalization	System.Object	class	mscorlib	2.0.x.x
EventAttributes	System.Reflection	System.Enum	enumeration	mscorlib	2.0.x.x
EventInfo	System.Reflection	System.Reflection.MemberInfo	class	mscorlib	2.0.x.x
FieldAttributes	System.Reflection	System.Enum	enumeration	mscorlib	2.0.x.x
FieldInfo	System.Reflection	System.Reflection.MemberInfo	class	mscorlib	2.0.x.x
GenericParameterAttributes	System.Reflection	System.Enum	enumeration	mscorlib	2.0.x.x
MemberInfo	System.Reflection	System.Object	class	mscorlib	2.0.x.x
MethodAttributes	System.Reflection	System.Enum	enumeration	mscorlib	2.0.x.x
MethodBase	System.Reflection	System.Reflection.MemberInfo	class	mscorlib	2.0.x.x
MethodInfo	System.Reflection	System.Reflection.MethodBase	class	mscorlib	2.0.x.x
Module	System.Reflection	System.Object	class	mscorlib	2.0.x.x
ParameterAttributes	System.Reflection	System.Enum	enumeration	mscorlib	2.0.x.x
ParameterInfo	System.Reflection	System.Object	class	mscorlib	2.0.x.x
ParameterModifier	System.Reflection	System.ValueType	structure	mscorlib	2.0.x.x
PropertyAttributes	System.Reflection	System.Enum	enumeration	mscorlib	2.0.x.x
PropertyInfo	System.Reflection	System.Reflection.MemberInfo	class	mscorlib	2.0.x.x
ReflectionPermission	System.Security.Permissions	System.Security.CodeAccessPermission	class	mscorlib	2.0.x.x
ReflectionPermissionAttribute	System.Security.Permissions	System.Security.Permissions.CodeAccessSecurityAttribute	class	mscorlib	2.0.x.x
ReflectionPermissionFlag	System.Security.Permissions	System.Enum	enumeration	mscorlib	2.0.x.x
TargetException	System.Reflection	System.ApplicationException	class	mscorlib	2.0.x.x
TargetInvocationException	System.Reflection	System.ApplicationException	class	mscorlib	2.0.x.x
TargetParameterCountException	System.Reflection	System.ApplicationException	class	mscorlib	2.0.x.x
TypeAttributes	System.Reflection	System.Enum	enumeration	mscorlib	2.0.x.x
Void	System	System.ValueType	structure	mscorlib	2.0.x.x

=== XML Library ===
Name	Namespace	Base type	CIL type	Assembly name	Assembly version
Formatting	System.Xml	System.Enum	enumeration	System.Xml	2.0.x.x
NameTable	System.Xml	System.Xml.XmlNameTable	class	System.Xml	2.0.x.x
ReadState	System.Xml	System.Enum	enumeration	System.Xml	2.0.x.x
WhitespaceHandling	System.Xml	System.Enum	enumeration	System.Xml	2.0.x.x
WriteState	System.Xml	System.Enum	enumeration	System.Xml	2.0.x.x
XmlConvert	System.Xml	System.Object	class	System.Xml	2.0.x.x
XmlException	System.Xml	System.SystemException	class	System.Xml	2.0.x.x
XmlNamespaceManager	System.Xml	System.Object	class	System.Xml	2.0.x.x
XmlNameTable	System.Xml	System.Object	class	System.Xml	2.0.x.x
XmlNodeType	System.Xml	System.Enum	enumeration	System.Xml	2.0.x.x
XmlParserContext	System.Xml	System.Object	class	System.Xml	2.0.x.x
XmlReader	System.Xml	System.Object	class	System.Xml	2.0.x.x
XmlResolver	System.Xml	System.Object	class	System.Xml	2.0.x.x
XmlSpace	System.Xml	System.Enum	enumeration	System.Xml	2.0.x.x
XmlTextReader	System.Xml	System.Xml.XmlReader	class	System.Xml	2.0.x.x
XmlTextWriter	System.Xml	System.Xml.XmlWriter	class	System.Xml	2.0.x.x
XmlUrlResolver	System.Xml	System.Xml.XmlResolver	class	System.Xml	2.0.x.x

=== Extended Array Library ===
The Extended Array Library provides support for non-vector arrays. That is, arrays that have more than one dimension or arrays that have non-zero lower bounds. The Extended Array Library doesn't add any extra types, but it does extend the array-handling mechanism.

=== Extended Numerics Library ===
Name	Namespace	Base type	CIL type	Assembly name	Assembly version
Decimal	System	System.ValueType	structure	mscorlib	2.0.x.x
Double	System	System.ValueType	structure	mscorlib	2.0.x.x
Math	System	System.Object	class	mscorlib	2.0.x.x
NotFiniteNumberException	System	System.ArithmeticException	class	mscorlib	2.0.x.x
Single	System	System.ValueType	structure	mscorlib	2.0.x.x

=== Parallel Library ===
Name	Namespace	Base type	CIL type	Assembly name	Assembly version
ParallelEnvironment	System.Threading.Parallel	System.Object	class	mscorlib	2.0.x.x
ParallelFor	System.Threading.Parallel	System.Threading.Parallel.ParallelLoop<int32>	class	System.Threading.Parallel	2.0.x.x
ParallelForEach<T>	System.Threading.Parallel	System.Threading.Parallel.ParallelLoop<T>	class	System.Threading.Parallel	2.0.x.x
ParallelLoop<T>	System.Threading.Parallel	System.Object	class	System.Threading.Parallel	2.0.x.x
ParallelWhile<T>	System.Threading.Parallel	System.Threading.Parallel.ParallelLoop<T>	class	System.Threading.Parallel	2.0.x.x

=== Vararg Library ===
Name	Namespace	Base type	CIL type	Assembly name	Assembly version
ArgIterator	System	System.ValueType	structure	mscorlib	2.0.x.x
RuntimeArgumentHandle	System	System.ValueType	structure	mscorlib	2.0.x.x
TypedReference	System	System.ValueType	structure	mscorlib	2.0.x.x
