= Framework Class Library =

Standard library of Microsoft's .NET Framework

The Framework Class Library (FCL) is a component of Microsoft's .NET Framework, the first implementation of the Common Language Infrastructure (CLI). In much the same way as Common Language Runtime (CLR) implements the CLI Virtual Execution System (VES), the FCL implements the CLI foundational Standard Libraries. As a CLI foundational class libraries implementation, it is a collection of reusable classes, interfaces, and value types, and includes an implementation of the CLI Base Class Library (BCL).

With Microsoft's move to .NET Core, the CLI foundational class libraries implementation is known as CoreFX instead of Framework Class Library.

The Framework Class Library is organized into a hierarchy of namespaces, with the most commonly used functionality found in the System.* and Microsoft.* namespaces. It provides a wide range of reusable types, including collections, input/output, base data types, networking, and XML processing, which support the development of desktop, web, and server applications across the .NET platform.

== See also ==
- Standard Libraries (CLI)
- Base Class Library (BCL)
