= WCF Data Services =

- Original author(s): Microsoft
- Initial release: August 11, 2008; 16 years ago
- Stable release: 5.6.0
- Operating system: Microsoft Windows, Linux, macOS
- Website: docs.microsoft.com/en-us/previous-versions/dotnet/wcf-data-services/hh487257(v=vs.103)

WCF Data Services (formerly ADO.NET Data Services, codename "Astoria") is a platform for what Microsoft calls Data Services. It is actually a combination of the runtime and a web service through which the services are exposed. It also includes the Data Services Toolkit which lets Astoria Data Services be created from within ASP.NET itself. The Astoria project was announced at MIX 2007, and the first developer preview was made available on April 30, 2007. The first CTP was made available as a part of the ASP.NET 3.5 Extensions Preview. The final version was released as part of Service Pack 1 of the .NET Framework 3.5 on August 11, 2008. The name change from ADO.NET Data Services to WCF data Services was announced at the 2009 PDC.

== Overview ==
WCF Data Services exposes data, represented as Entity Data Model (EDM) objects, via web services accessed over HTTP. The data can be addressed using a REST-like URI. The data service, when accessed via the HTTP GET method with such a URI, will return the data. The web service can be configured to return the data in either plain XML, JSON or RDF+XML. In the initial release, formats like RSS and ATOM are not supported, though they may be in the future. In addition, using other HTTP methods like PUT, POST or DELETE, the data can be updated as well. POST can be used to create new entities, PUT for updating an entity, and DELETE for deleting an entity.

== Description ==
Windows Communication Foundation (WCF) comes to the rescue when we find ourselves not able to achieve what we want to achieve using web services, i.e., other protocols support and even duplex communication. With WCF, we can define our service once and then configure it in such a way that it can be used via HTTP, TCP, IPC, and even Message Queues. We can consume Web Services using server side scripts (ASP.NET), JavaScript Object Notations (JSON), and even REST (Representational State Transfer).

Understanding the basics

When we say that a WCF service can be used to communicate using different protocols and from different kinds of applications, we will need to understand how we can achieve this. If we want to use a WCF service from an application, then we have three major questions:

1.Where is the WCF service located from a client's perspective? 2.How can a client access the service, i.e., protocols and message formats? 3.What is the functionality that a service is providing to the clients?

Once we have the answer to these three questions, then creating and consuming the WCF service will be a lot easier for us. The WCF service has the concept of endpoints. A WCF service provides endpoints which client applications can use to communicate with the WCF service. The answer to these above questions is what is known as the ABC of WCF services and in fact are the main components of a WCF service. So let's tackle each question one by one.

Address: Like a webservice, a WCF service also provides a URI which can be used by clients to get to the WCF service. This URI is called as the Address of the WCF service. This will solve the first problem of "where to locate the WCF service?" for us.

Binding: Once we are able to locate the WCF service, one should think about how to communicate with the service (protocol wise). The binding is what defines how the WCF service handles the communication. It could also define other communication parameters like message encoding, etc. This will solve the second problem of "how to communicate with the WCF service?" for us.

Contract: Now the only question one is left with is about the functionalities that a WCF service provides. The contract is what defines the public data and interfaces that WCF service provides to the clients.

The URIs representing the data will contain the physical location of the service, as well as the service name. It will also need to specify an EDM Entity-Set or a specific entity instance, as in respectively

http://dataserver/service.svc/MusicCollection

or

http://dataserver/service.svc/MusicCollection[SomeArtist]

The former will list all entities in the Collection set whereas the latter will list only for the entity which is indexed by SomeArtist.

The URIs can also specify a traversal of a relationship in the Entity Data Model. For example,

http://dataserver/service.svc/MusicCollection[SomeSong]/Genre

traverses the relationship Genre (in SQL parlance, joins with the Genre table) and retrieves all instances of Genre that are associated with the entity SomeSong. Simple predicates can also be specified in the URI, like

http://dataserver/service.svc/MusicCollection[SomeArtist]/ReleaseDate[Year eq 2006]

will fetch the items that are indexed by SomeArtist and had their release in 2006. Filtering and partition information can also be encoded in the URL as

http://dataserver/service.svc/MusicCollection?$orderby=ReleaseDate&$skip=100&$top=50

Although the presence of skip and top keywords indicates paging support, in Data Services version 1 there is no method of determining the number of records available and thus impossible to determine how many pages there may be. The OData 2.0 spec adds support for the $count path segment (to return just a count of entities) and $inlineCount (to retrieve a page worth of entities and a total count without a separate round-trip....).
