= Virtual Execution System =

Common Language Infrastructure

The Virtual Execution System (VES) is a run-time system of the Common Language Infrastructure CLI which provides an environment for executing managed code. It provides direct support for a set of built-in data types, defines a hypothetical machine with an associated machine model and state, a set of control flow constructs, and an exception handling model. Also known as an Execution Engine, the purpose of the VES is to provide the support required to execute managed code and data (the Common Intermediate Language CIL instruction set).

== Implementations ==
The Common Language Runtime (CLR) implements the VES as defined in the Common Language Infrastructure (CLI) standard. Other notable implementations of the CLI such as Mono and Portable.NET include their own VES implementations. The .NET Micro Framework includes the .NET Micro Framework Interpreter as their VES implementation.

== See also ==
- Native Image Generator
- Application domain
