= Standard Libraries (CLI) =

Standard libraries of C#, the .NET Framework and Core, and related projects

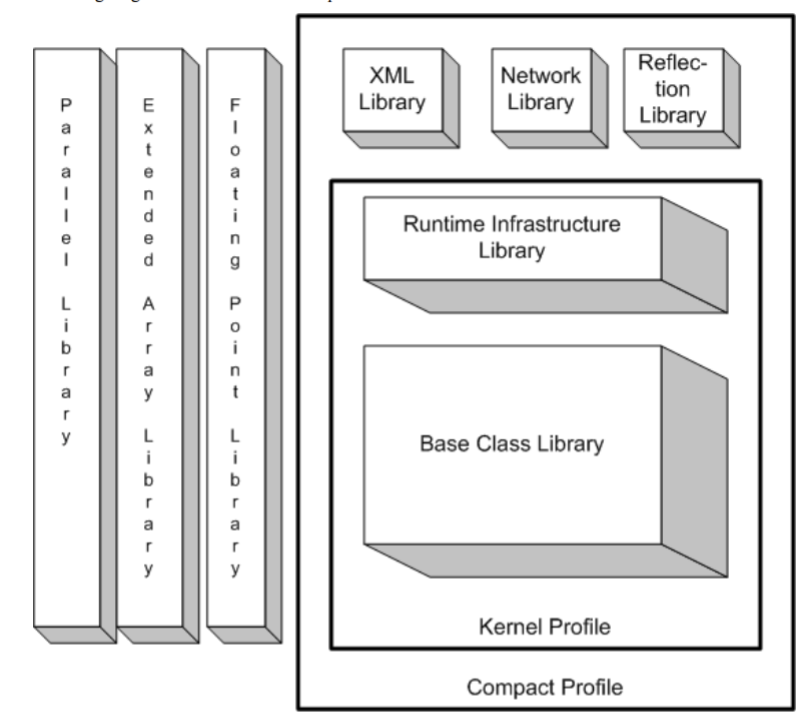

The Standard Libraries are a set of standard libraries included in the Common Language Infrastructure (CLI) in order to encapsulate many common functions, such as file reading and writing, XML document manipulation, exception handling, application globalization, network communication, threading, and reflection, which makes the programmer's job easier. It is much larger in scope than standard libraries for most other languages, including C++, and is comparable in scope and coverage to the standard libraries of Java.

The Standard Libraries are the Base Class Library (BCL), Runtime Infrastructure Library (both part of the kernel profile), Network Library, Reflection Library, XML Library (which with the first two listed libraries form the compact profile), Extended Array Library, Parallel Library, Floating Point Library and Vararg Library.

The Framework Class Library (FCL) is the original implementation of the Standard Libraries as the .NET Framework, which includes it, is the first implementation of the CLI.

The standard libraries primarily belong to namespace System.*. Microsoft, the developers of the .NET platform, also provide official extension libraries in Microsoft.* and Microsoft.Extensions.*, though they are not part of the official .NET standard library.

== Profiles ==
The main standard libraries are organized into two Standard Profiles, the Kernel Profile, and the Compact Profile. The following standard libraries do not belong to any profile: the Extended Array Library, the Extended Numerics Library, the Parallel Library and the Vararg Library.

=== Kernel Profile ===
The Kernel Profile is a subset of the Compact Profile. The Kernel Profile contains the Base Class Library (BCL) and Runtime Infrastructure Library.

=== Compact Profile ===
The Compact Profile contains those libraries in the Kernel Profile as well as the Network Library, the Reflection Library and the XML Library.

== Libraries ==
=== Base Class Library ===
The Base Class Library is a simple runtime library for modern programming languages. It serves as the Standard for the runtime library for the language C# as well as one of the CLI Standard Libraries. It provides types to represent the built-in data types of the CLI, simple file access, custom attributes, security attributes, string manipulation, formatting, streams, collections, among other things. It defines types in the following namespaces:

Name	Description
System	Defines the Object class which all reference type objects derive from (including value-type objects) and the ValueType class which all value type objects derive from. It also defines the base data types like integers, floating point numbers, character, strings, Boolean, enumeration and more. Support for the environment and platform and a command-line interface is provided along with base classes for exceptions and attributes. It defines arrays and delegates, mathematical functions and many other types.
System.Collections	Defines many common container types used in programming, such as dictionaries, hashtables, lists, queues and stacks.
System.Collections.Generic	Defines generic types of the container types in the System.Collections namespace.
System.Diagnostics	Defines types that provide the ability to diagnose applications. It includes event logging, performance counters, tracing and interaction with system processes.
System.Globalization	Defines types that define culture-related information, including language, country/region, calendars in use, format patterns for dates, currency and numbers and sort order for strings.
System.IO	Defines type that enable reading from and writing to different streams, such as files or other data streams. Also provides a connection to the file system.
System.Security	Defines types that represent the security system and permissions.
System.Security.Permissions	Defines types that control access to operations and resources based on policy.
System.Text	Defines types that support various character encodings, regular expressions and a more efficient mechanism for manipulating strings.
System.Threading	Defines types that enable multithreaded programming.

UML package diagram of the stream hierarchy in .NET

=== Runtime Infrastructure Library ===
The Runtime Infrastructure Library provides the services needed by a compiler to target the CLI and the facilities needed to dynamically load types from a stream in a specified file format. It defines types in the following namespaces:

Name	Description
System	Defines types for the application domain, pointers, handles and more.
System.Reflection	Defines types that provide a managed view of loaded types, methods and fields, and that can dynamically create and invoke types. These types are relevant to the program runtime.
System.Runtime.CompilerServices	Defines types that provide functionality for compiler writers who use managed code to specify attributes in metadata that affect the run-time behavior of the Virtual Execution System.
System.Runtime.InteropServices	Defines types that support Platform Invocation Services (P/Invoke).

=== Network Library ===
The Network Library provides simple networking services including direct access to network ports as well as HTTP support. It defines types in the following namespaces:

Name	Description
System	Defines types that provide an object representation of a uniform resource identifier (URI) and easy access to the parts of the URI.
System.Collections.Specialized	Defines specialized and strongly-typed collections; for example, a linked list dictionary, a bit vector, and collections that contain only strings.
System.Net	Defines types that provide a simple programming interface for a number of network protocols.
System.Net.Sockets	Defines type that provide a managed implementation of the Windows Sockets (Winsock) interface for developers who need to tightly control access to the network.

=== Reflection Library ===
The Reflection Library provides the ability to examine the structure of types, create instances of types and invoke methods on types, all based on a description of the type. It defines types in the following namespaces:

Name	Description
System	Defines the void type, a return value type for a method that does not return a value.
System.Globalization	Defines type that provide information about a specific culture (called a locale for unmanaged code development). The information includes the names for the culture, the writing system, the calendar used and formatting for dates and sort strings.
System.Reflection	Defines types that provide a managed view of loaded types, methods and fields, and that can dynamically create and invoke types.
System.Security.Permissions	Defines types that control access to operations and resources based on policy. These types are relevant to the reflection.

=== XML Library ===
The XML Library provides a simple "pull-style" parser for XML. It is designed for resource-constrained devices, yet provides a simple user model. It defines types in the following namespace.

Name	Description
System.Xml	Defines types for processing XML.

=== Windows Presentation Foundation Library ===
Microsoft has a namespace for the Windows Presentation Foundation (WPF) application classes.

Name	Description
System.Windows	Defines classes for WPF applications.

=== Extended Array Library ===
The Extended Array Library provides support for non-vector arrays. That is, arrays that have more than one dimension or arrays that have non-zero lower bounds. The Extended Array Library doesn't add any extra types, but it does extend the array-handling mechanism.

=== Extended Numerics Library ===
The Extended Numerics Library provides support for floating-point (System.Single, System.Double) and extended-precision (System.Decimal) data types. Like the Base Class Library, this library is directly referenced by the C# standard.

=== Parallel Library ===
The Parallel Library provides easy parallelism for non-expert programmers, so that multithreaded CPUs can be exploited.

=== Vararg Library ===
The Vararg Library provides support for dealing with variable-length argument lists.

== See also ==
- List of data types of the Standard Libraries
- Framework Class Library
