= Common Language Runtime =

Virtual machine component of Microsoft's .NET framework

The Common Language Runtime (CLR), the virtual machine component of Microsoft .NET Framework, manages the execution of .NET programs. Just-in-time compilation converts the managed code (compiled intermediate language code) into machine instructions which are then executed on the CPU of the computer. The CLR provides additional services including memory management, type safety, exception handling, garbage collection, security and thread management. All programs written for the .NET Framework, regardless of programming language, are executed in the CLR. All versions of the .NET Framework include CLR. The CLR team was started June 13, 1998.

CLR implements the Virtual Execution System (VES) as defined in the Common Language Infrastructure (CLI) standard, initially developed by Microsoft itself. A public standard defines the Common Language Infrastructure specification.

Overview of the .NET Framework CLR release history
CLR version	.NET version
1.0	1.0
1.1	1.1
2.0	2.0, 3.0, 3.5
4	4, 4.5, 4.6, 4.7, 4.8

During the transition from legacy .NET technologies like the .NET Framework and its proprietary runtime to the community-developed .NET Core, the CLR was dubbed CoreCLR. The term CLR today may refer to either the .NET Framework CLR or Core CLR

Since .NET 5, the runtime for .NET follows a yearly release cadence, releasing a new version every November

== See also ==
- Common Intermediate Language
- List of CLI languages
- Java virtual machine
