= IL2CPU =

- Developer(s): Cosmos Project
- Stable release: Release 20221121 / 21 November 2022; 2 years ago
- Repository: github.com/CosmosOS/IL2CPU
- Available in: English
- License: BSD
- Website: github.com/CosmosOS

IL2CPU (IL To CPU) is an ahead-of-time (AOT) compiler for .NET that is written using one of its Common Intermediate Language compliant languages (C#). It translates Common Intermediate Language to bare metal machine code. IL2CPU is the primary compilation component of the Cosmos Project, and is developed by the same team.

== History ==
IL2CPU was created in 2005 by the Cosmos team. It was originally designed for the .NET Framework, but has since been upgraded to .NET Core, which is now known as just .NET.

As of 2022, it is planned to be superseded by .NET's native ahead-of-time (AOT) compiler, NativeAOT, however it is still in active development.

As of late 2024 two from the core development team have started work on porting IL2CPUs plug system to .NET's native ahead-of-time (AOT) compiler in hopes to replace the current setup

== Technical details ==
IL2CPU is a console program invoked by the Cosmos build process. It takes in a dynamic link library (DLL) file, systematically scans its opcodes and outputs x86 instructions to be consumed by one of Cosmos's output methods, e.g. to create an ISO disk image file or to be booted over the network via PXE.

== See also ==
- Cosmos
- .NET
- Mono
- Bartok
- Open CIL JIT
