= Download Cache =

The Download Cache, or downloaded files cache, is a component of Microsoft's .NET Framework that is similar to the Global Assembly Cache except that it caches assemblies that have been downloaded from the Internet.

Assemblies are downloaded from the Internet when a specific managed object is requested using the <object> tag in a web page. For example, the following HTML will cause Internet Explorer to download MyAssembly.dll to the Download Cache and will subsequently instantiate MyControl on the page that contains it.

<object id="myControlId" classid="http://MyServer/MyVirtualFolder/MyAssembly.dll#MyNamespace.MyControl">
<param name="MyProperty" value="SomeStringValue" />
</object>

== Usage ==
Like the GAC, the Download Cache can be accessed with gacutil.exe.

One can list the contents of the Download Cache using the command:

gacutil.exe /ldl

One can delete the contents of the Download Cache using the command:

gacutil.exe /cdl
