= SharpOS =

Operating system written in C#

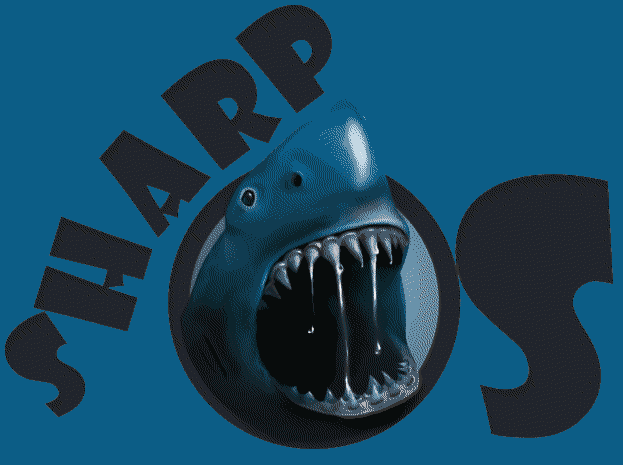

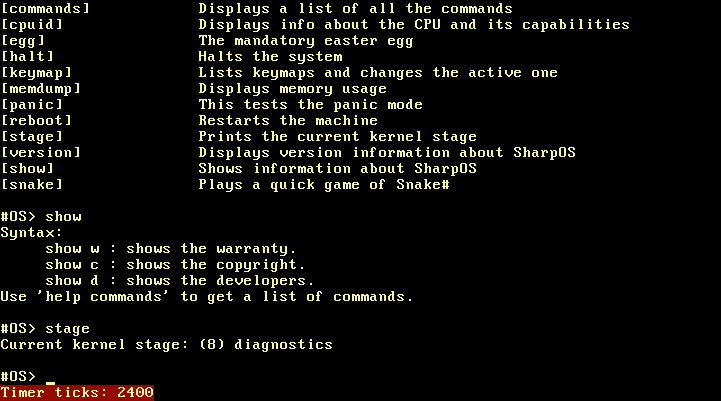
- SharpOS v0.0.0.75
- Developer: SharpOS Project
- Written in: C#
- OS family: .NET Framework
- Working state: Discontinued
- Source model: Open-source
- Initial release: 1 January 2008; 18 years ago
- Final release: 0.0.1 / 1 January 2008; 18 years ago
- Available in: English
- Supported platforms: x86
- Kernel type: Microkernel
- Default user interface: Command-line interface
- License: GNU General Public License version 3 with the GPL linking exception
- Official website: sharpos.org

SharpOS is a discontinued computer operating system based on the .NET Framework and related programming language C#. It was developed by a group of volunteers and presided over by a team of six project administrators: Mircea-Cristian Racasan, Bruce Markham, Johann MacDonagh, Sander van Rossen, Jae Hyun, and William Lahti. It is no longer in active development, and resources have been moved to the MOSA project. As of 2017, SharpOS is one of three C#-based operating systems released under a free and open-source software license. SharpOS has only one public version available. and a basic command-line interface.

== History ==
SharpOS began in November 2006 as a public discussion on the Mono development mailing list as a thread named Operating System in C#. After attracting many participants, Michael Schurter created the SharpOS.org wiki and mailing list to continue the discussion at a more relevant location. Soon after, the core developers (Bruce Markham, William Lahti, Sander van Rossen, and Mircea-Cristian Racasan) decided that they would design their own ahead-of-time (AOT) compiler to allow the operating system to run its boot sequence without using another programming language. Once the AOT compiler was developed enough, the team then began to code the kernel. This was met with long periods of inactivity and few active developers due to lack of interest in unsafe kernel programming. On 1 January 2008, the SharpOS team made their first milestone release public, this is the first version of the software to appear in the SharpOS SourceForge package repository available for general public use.

== See also ==
- Singularity (operating system)
- Cosmos (operating system)
