= ILAsm =

Microsoft Assembler for textual representation of Common Intermediate Language

ILAsm (IL Assembler) generates a portable executable (PE) file from a text representation of Common Intermediate Language (CIL) code. It is not to be confused with NGEN (Native Image Generator), which compiles Common Intermediate Language code into native code as a .NET assembly is deployed.

ILAsm is commonly used in low‑level .NET development scenarios, such as debugging, testing, or learning the inner workings of the Common Language Runtime. It allows developers to inspect and manipulate the intermediate language code directly, which can be useful for performance tuning, manual optimization, or injecting custom metadata.

ILAsm supports generating both console applications and class libraries, allowing developers to specify metadata, define assembly references, and set entry points for managed code. It can also produce debug information compatible with the Visual Studio debugger, which enables step‑through debugging at the IL level. These features make ILAsm a valuable tool for learning, testing compiler output, or performing low‑level modifications to .NET assemblies.

== See also ==
- .NET Framework
- Common Language Runtime
- Common Intermediate Language
- Native Image Generator
