= Cambridge Business Park =

Business park in Cambridge, England

Coordinates: 52.2281°N 0.1542°E

Cambridge Business Park is a large business complex in Cambridge, England, owned by the Crown Estate. It is home to many companies, mostly IT-related, such as Qualcomm, Autonomy, MathWorks and Red Gate Software, but also intellectual property firms such as Mewburn Ellis, Venner Shipley and Mathys and Squire.

It is close to Cambridge North railway station and the Cambridgeshire Guided Busway, as well as Cambridge Science Park and St John's Innovation Centre.

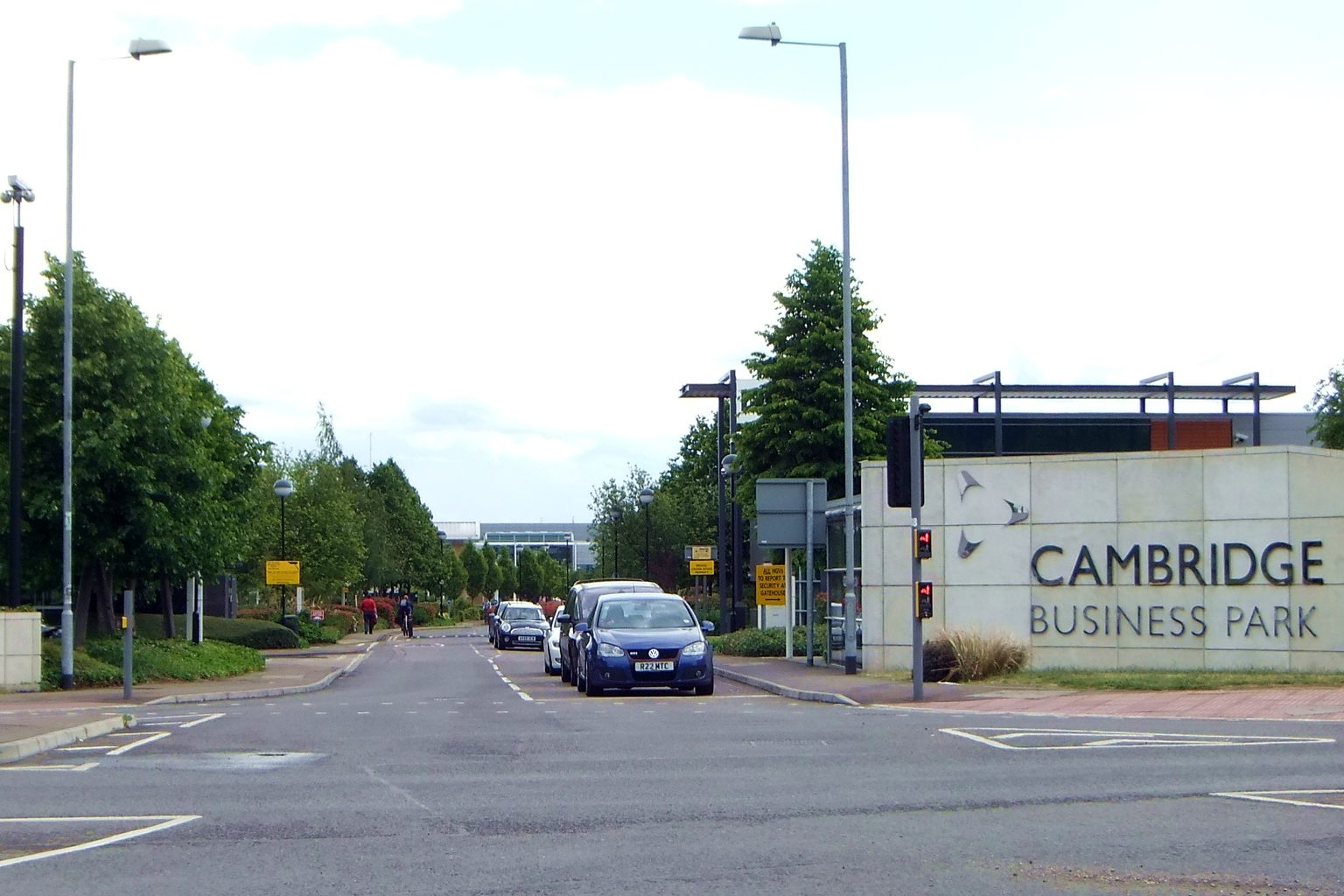
Cambridge Business Park entrance

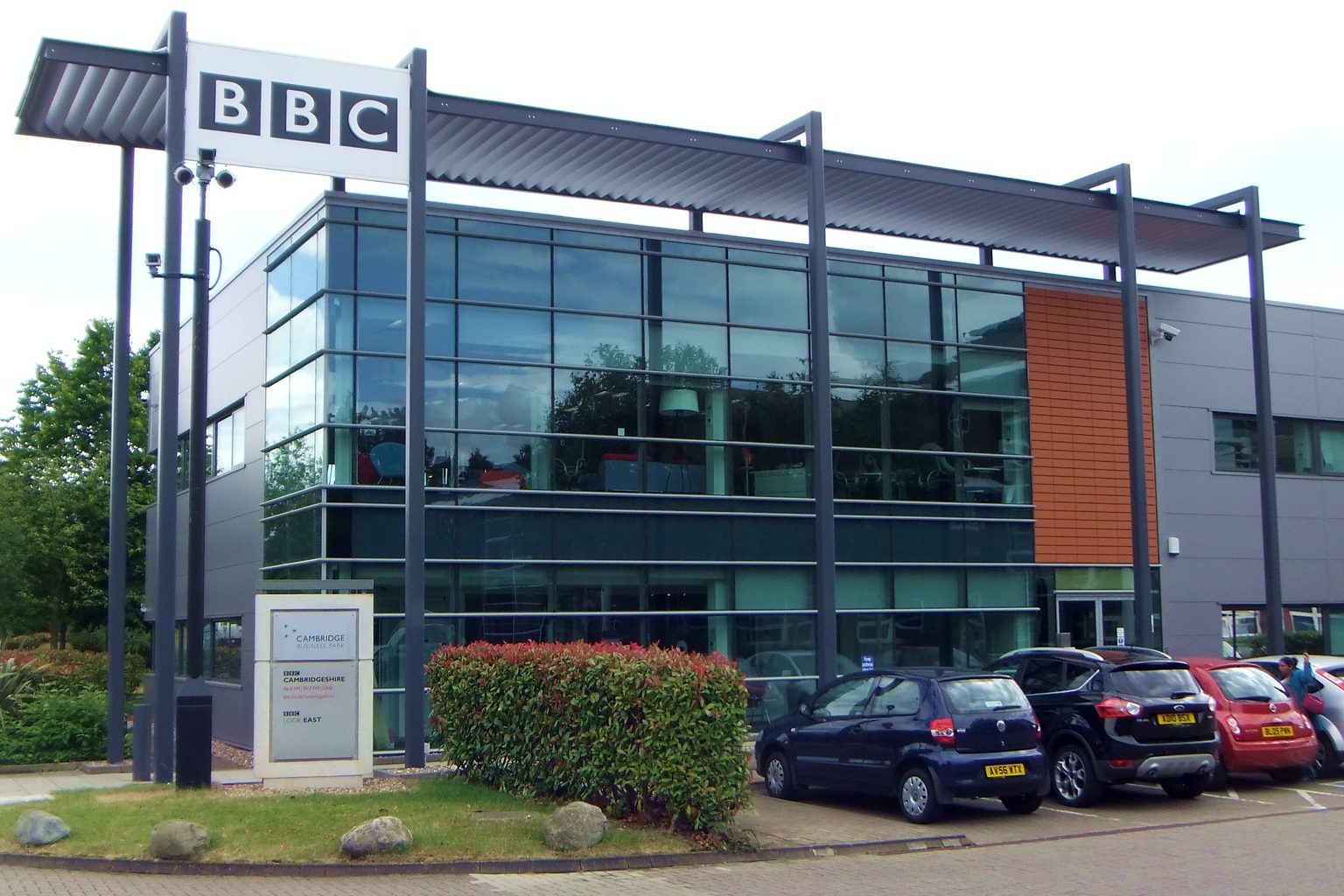
BBC Cambridgeshire building at Cambridge Business Park

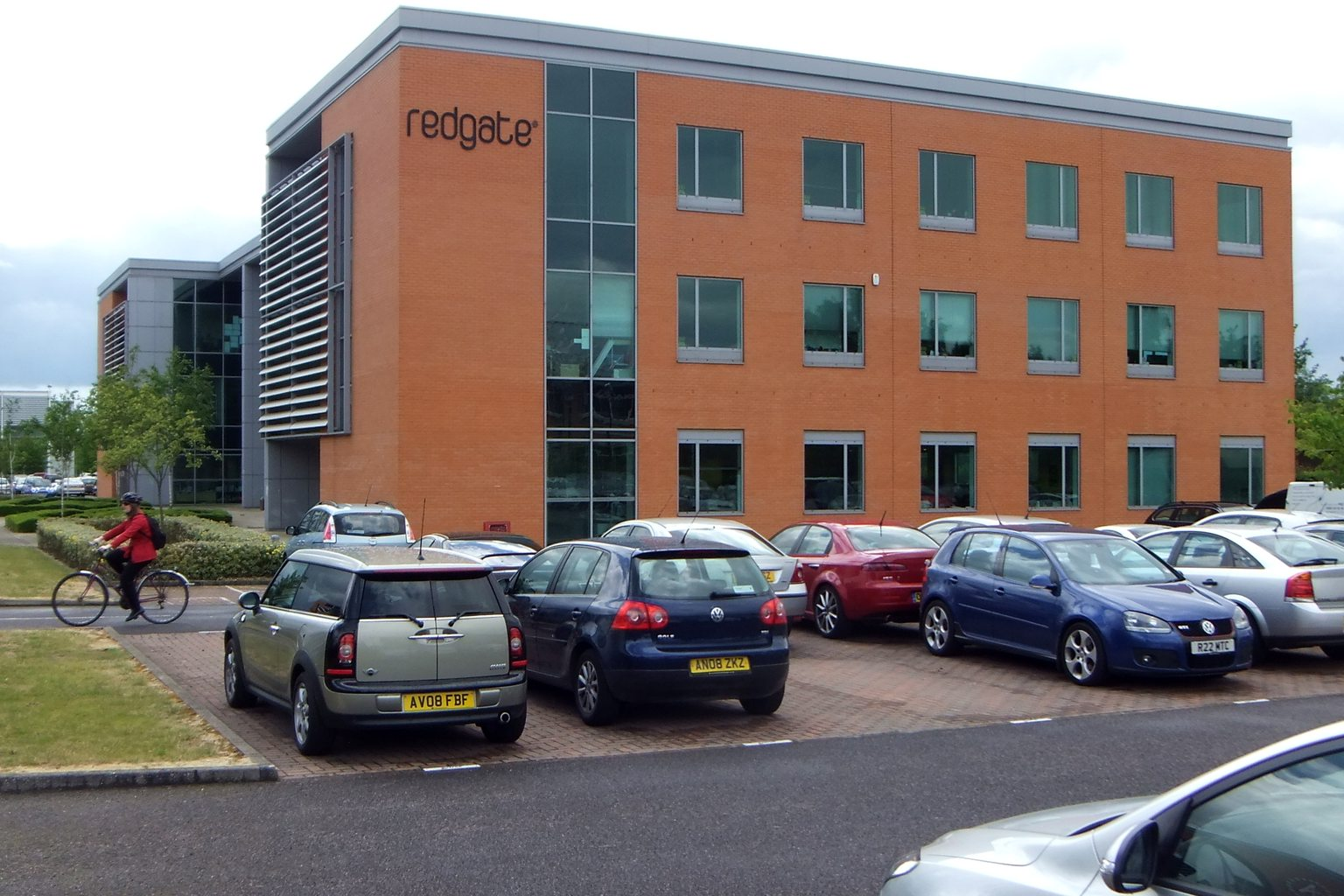
Red Gate Software headquarters at Cambridge Business Park

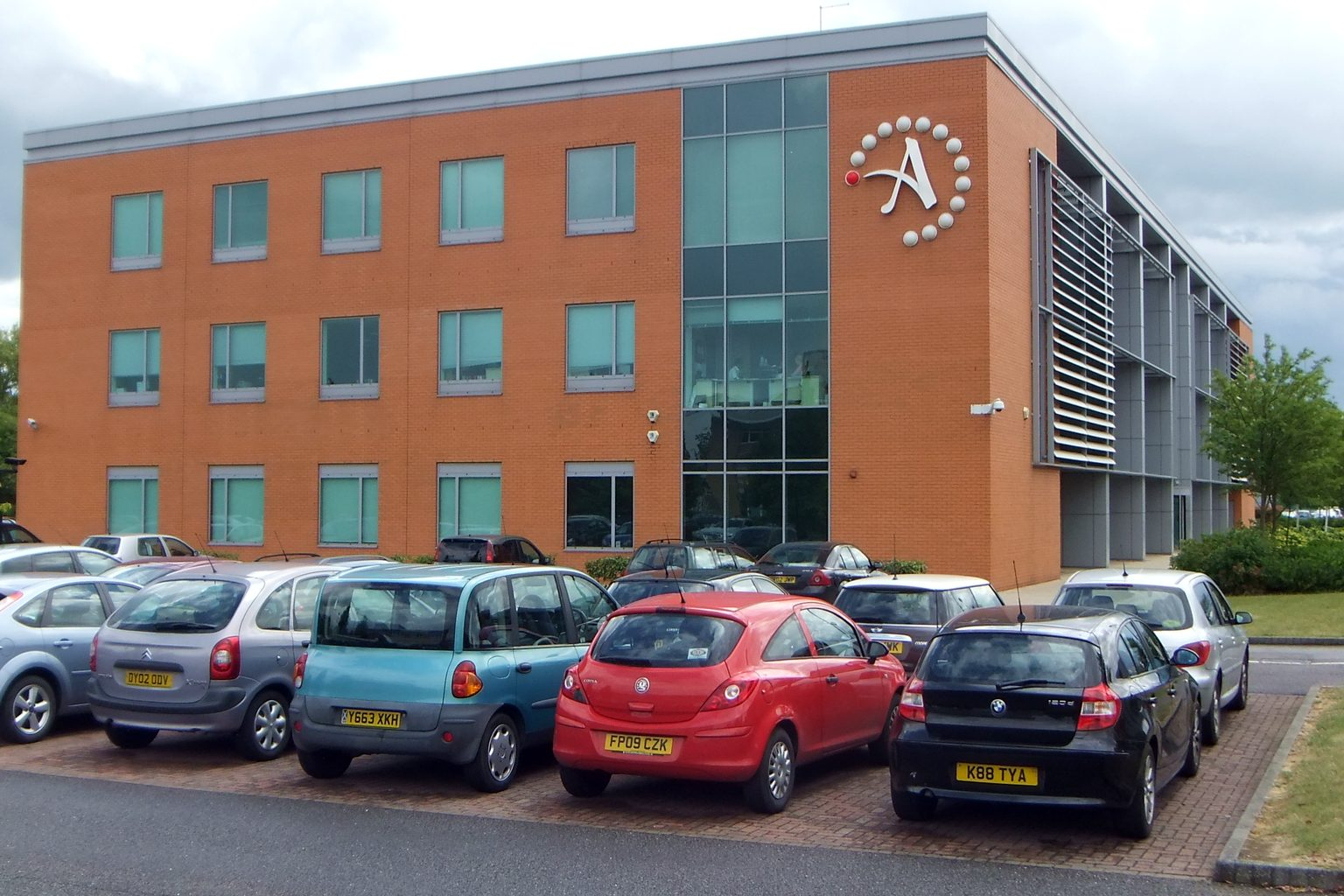
Autonomy Corporation headquarters at Cambridge Business Park

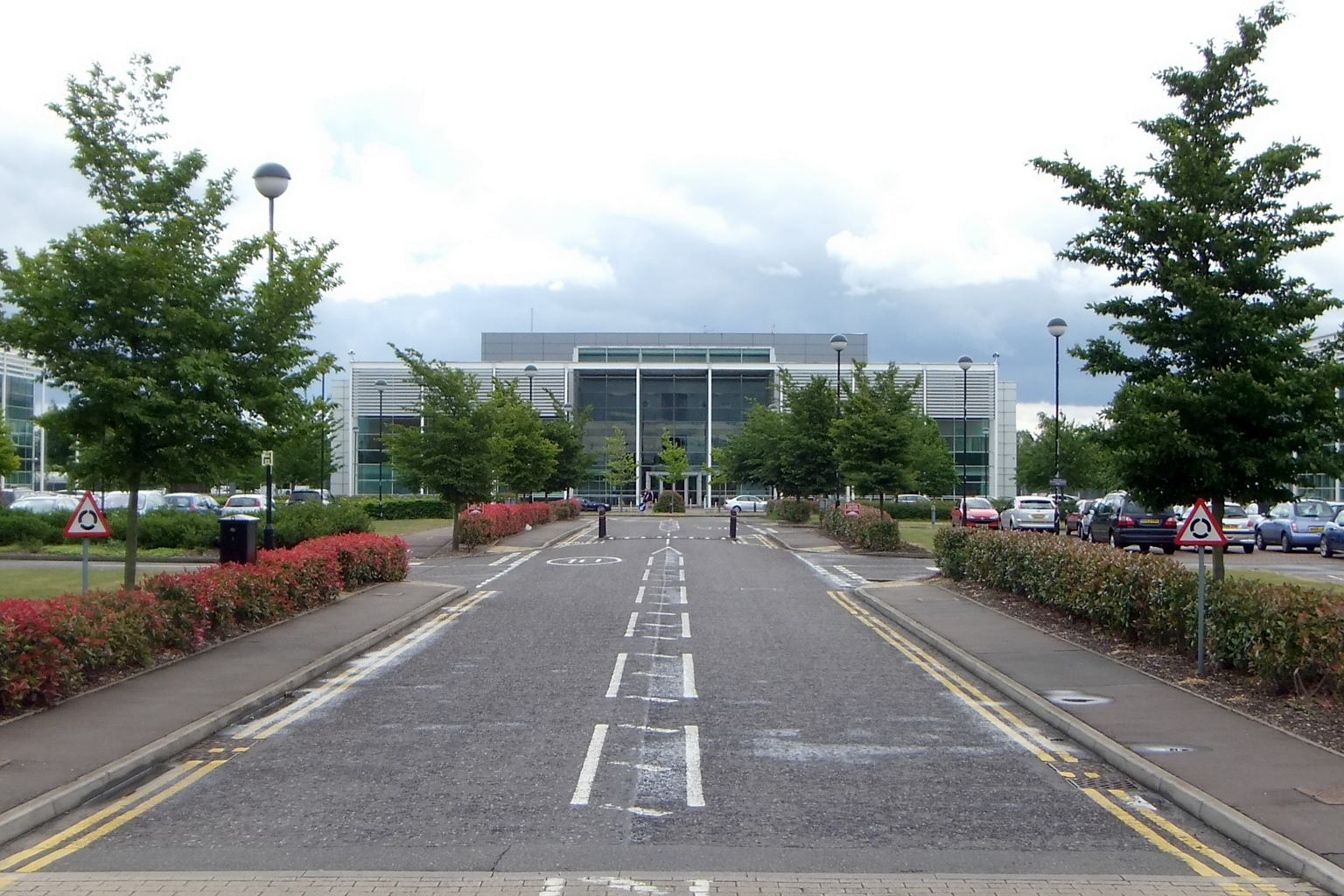
Qualcomm Churchill House office at Cambridge Business Park

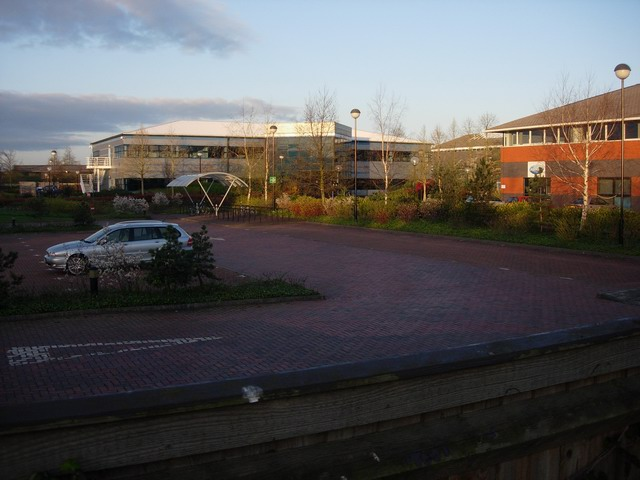
A car and bicycle park and some office buildings

== See also ==
- Silicon Fen
- Cambridge Science Park
