= List of CIL instructions =

This is a list of the instructions in the instruction set of the Common Intermediate Language bytecode.

- Opcode abbreviated from operation code is the portion of a machine language instruction that specifies the operation to be performed.
- Base instructions form a Turing-complete instruction set.
- Object model instructions provide an implementation for the Common Type System.

Opcode	Instruction	Description	Type of instruction
0x58	add	Add two values, returning a new value.	Base instruction
0xD6	add.ovf	Add signed integer values with overflow check.	Base instruction
0xD7	add.ovf.un	Add unsigned integer values with overflow check.	Base instruction
0x5F	and	Bitwise AND of two integral values, returns an integral value.	Base instruction
0xFE 0x00	arglist	Return argument list handle for the current method.	Base instruction
0x3B	beq <int32 (target)>	Branch to target if equal.	Base instruction
0x2E	beq.s <int8 (target)>	Branch to target if equal, short form.	Base instruction
0x3C	bge <int32 (target)>	Branch to target if greater than or equal to.	Base instruction
0x2F	bge.s <int8 (target)>	Branch to target if greater than or equal to, short form.	Base instruction
0x41	bge.un <int32 (target)>	Branch to target if greater than or equal to (unsigned or unordered).	Base instruction
0x34	bge.un.s <int8 (target)>	Branch to target if greater than or equal to (unsigned or unordered), short form.	Base instruction
0x3D	bgt <int32 (target)>	Branch to target if greater than.	Base instruction
0x30	bgt.s <int8 (target)>	Branch to target if greater than, short form.	Base instruction
0x42	bgt.un <int32 (target)>	Branch to target if greater than (unsigned or unordered).	Base instruction
0x35	bgt.un.s <int8 (target)>	Branch to target if greater than (unsigned or unordered), short form.	Base instruction
0x3E	ble <int32 (target)>	Branch to target if less than or equal to.	Base instruction
0x31	ble.s <int8 (target)>	Branch to target if less than or equal to, short form.	Base instruction
0x43	ble.un <int32 (target)>	Branch to target if less than or equal to (unsigned or unordered).	Base instruction
0x36	ble.un.s <int8 (target)>	Branch to target if less than or equal to (unsigned or unordered), short form.	Base instruction
0x3F	blt <int32 (target)>	Branch to target if less than.	Base instruction
0x32	blt.s <int8 (target)>	Branch to target if less than, short form.	Base instruction
0x44	blt.un <int32 (target)>	Branch to target if less than (unsigned or unordered).	Base instruction
0x37	blt.un.s <int8 (target)>	Branch to target if less than (unsigned or unordered), short form.	Base instruction
0x40	bne.un <int32 (target)>	Branch to target if unequal or unordered.	Base instruction
0x33	bne.un.s <int8 (target)>	Branch to target if unequal or unordered, short form.	Base instruction
0x8C	box <typeTok>	Convert a boxable value to its boxed form.	Object model instruction
0x38	br <int32 (target)>	Branch to target.	Base instruction
0x2B	br.s <int8 (target)>	Branch to target, short form.	Base instruction
0x01	break	Inform a debugger that a breakpoint has been reached.	Base instruction
0x39	brfalse <int32 (target)>	Branch to target if value is zero (false).	Base instruction
0x2C	brfalse.s <int8 (target)>	Branch to target if value is zero (false), short form.	Base instruction
0x3A	brinst <int32 (target)>	Branch to target if value is a non-null object reference (alias for brtrue).	Base instruction
0x2D	brinst.s <int8 (target)>	Branch to target if value is a non-null object reference, short form (alias for brtrue.s).	Base instruction
0x39	brnull <int32 (target)>	Branch to target if value is null (alias for brfalse).	Base instruction
0x2C	brnull.s <int8 (target)>	Branch to target if value is null (alias for brfalse.s), short form.	Base instruction
0x3A	brtrue <int32 (target)>	Branch to target if value is non-zero (true).	Base instruction
0x2D	brtrue.s <int8 (target)>	Branch to target if value is non-zero (true), short form.	Base instruction
0x39	brzero <int32 (target)>	Branch to target if value is zero (alias for brfalse).	Base instruction
0x2C	brzero.s <int8 (target)>	Branch to target if value is zero (alias for brfalse.s), short form.	Base instruction
0x28	call <method>	Call method described by method.	Base instruction
0x29	calli <callsitedescr>	Call method indicated on the stack with arguments described by callsitedescr.	Base instruction
0x6F	callvirt <method>	Call a method associated with an object.	Object model instruction
0x74	castclass <class>	Cast obj to class.	Object model instruction
0xFE 0x01	ceq	Push 1 (of type int32) if value1 equals value2, else push 0.	Base instruction
0xFE 0x02	cgt	Push 1 (of type int32) if value1 greater than value2, else push 0.	Base instruction
0xFE 0x03	cgt.un	Push 1 (of type int32) if value1 greater than value2, unsigned or unordered, else push 0.	Base instruction
0xC3	ckfinite	Throw ArithmeticException if value is not a finite number.	Base instruction
0xFE 0x04	clt	Push 1 (of type int32) if value1 lower than value2, else push 0.	Base instruction
0xFE 0x05	clt.un	Push 1 (of type int32) if value1 lower than value2, unsigned or unordered, else push 0.	Base instruction
0xFE 0x16	constrained. <thisType>	Call a virtual method on a type constrained to be type T.	Prefix to instruction
0xD3	conv.i	Convert to native int, pushing native int on stack.	Base instruction
0x67	conv.i1	Convert to int8, pushing int32 on stack.	Base instruction
0x68	conv.i2	Convert to int16, pushing int32 on stack.	Base instruction
0x69	conv.i4	Convert to int32, pushing int32 on stack.	Base instruction
0x6A	conv.i8	Convert to int64, pushing int64 on stack.	Base instruction
0xD4	conv.ovf.i	Convert to a native int (on the stack as native int) and throw an exception on overflow.	Base instruction
0x8A	conv.ovf.i.un	Convert unsigned to a native int (on the stack as native int) and throw an exception on overflow.	Base instruction
0xB3	conv.ovf.i1	Convert to an int8 (on the stack as int32) and throw an exception on overflow.	Base instruction
0x82	conv.ovf.i1.un	Convert unsigned to an int8 (on the stack as int32) and throw an exception on overflow.	Base instruction
0xB5	conv.ovf.i2	Convert to an int16 (on the stack as int32) and throw an exception on overflow.	Base instruction
0x83	conv.ovf.i2.un	Convert unsigned to an int16 (on the stack as int32) and throw an exception on overflow.	Base instruction
0xB7	conv.ovf.i4	Convert to an int32 (on the stack as int32) and throw an exception on overflow.	Base instruction
0x84	conv.ovf.i4.un	Convert unsigned to an int32 (on the stack as int32) and throw an exception on overflow.	Base instruction
0xB9	conv.ovf.i8	Convert to an int64 (on the stack as int64) and throw an exception on overflow.	Base instruction
0x85	conv.ovf.i8.un	Convert unsigned to an int64 (on the stack as int64) and throw an exception on overflow.	Base instruction
0xD5	conv.ovf.u	Convert to a native unsigned int (on the stack as native int) and throw an exception on overflow.	Base instruction
0x8B	conv.ovf.u.un	Convert unsigned to a native unsigned int (on the stack as native int) and throw an exception on overflow.	Base instruction
0xB4	conv.ovf.u1	Convert to an unsigned int8 (on the stack as int32) and throw an exception on overflow.	Base instruction
0x86	conv.ovf.u1.un	Convert unsigned to an unsigned int8 (on the stack as int32) and throw an exception on overflow.	Base instruction
0xB6	conv.ovf.u2	Convert to an unsigned int16 (on the stack as int32) and throw an exception on overflow.	Base instruction
0x87	conv.ovf.u2.un	Convert unsigned to an unsigned int16 (on the stack as int32) and throw an exception on overflow.	Base instruction
0xB8	conv.ovf.u4	Convert to an unsigned int32 (on the stack as int32) and throw an exception on overflow.	Base instruction
0x88	conv.ovf.u4.un	Convert unsigned to an unsigned int32 (on the stack as int32) and throw an exception on overflow.	Base instruction
0xBA	conv.ovf.u8	Convert to an unsigned int64 (on the stack as int64) and throw an exception on overflow.	Base instruction
0x89	conv.ovf.u8.un	Convert unsigned to an unsigned int64 (on the stack as int64) and throw an exception on overflow.	Base instruction
0x76	conv.r.un	Convert unsigned integer to floating-point, pushing F on stack.	Base instruction
0x6B	conv.r4	Convert to float32, pushing F on stack.	Base instruction
0x6C	conv.r8	Convert to float64, pushing F on stack.	Base instruction
0xE0	conv.u	Convert to native unsigned int, pushing native int on stack.	Base instruction
0xD2	conv.u1	Convert to unsigned int8, pushing int32 on stack.	Base instruction
0xD1	conv.u2	Convert to unsigned int16, pushing int32 on stack.	Base instruction
0x6D	conv.u4	Convert to unsigned int32, pushing int32 on stack.	Base instruction
0x6E	conv.u8	Convert to unsigned int64, pushing int64 on stack.	Base instruction
0xFE 0x17	cpblk	Copy data from memory to memory.	Base instruction
0x70	cpobj <typeTok>	Copy a value type from src to dest.	Object model instruction
0x5B	div	Divide two values to return a quotient or floating-point result.	Base instruction
0x5C	div.un	Divide two values, unsigned, returning a quotient.	Base instruction
0x25	dup	Duplicate the value on the top of the stack.	Base instruction
0xDC	endfault	End fault clause of an exception block.	Base instruction
0xFE 0x11	endfilter	End an exception handling filter clause.	Base instruction
0xDC	endfinally	End finally clause of an exception block.	Base instruction
0xFE 0x18	initblk	Set all bytes in a block of memory to a given byte value.	Base instruction
0xFE 0x15	initobj <typeTok>	Initialize the value at address dest.	Object model instruction
0x75	isinst <class>	Test if obj is an instance of class, returning null or an instance of that class or interface.	Object model instruction
0x27	jmp <method>	Exit current method and jump to the specified method.	Base instruction
0xFE 0x09	ldarg <uint16 (num)>	Load argument numbered num onto the stack.	Base instruction
0x02	ldarg.0	Load argument 0 onto the stack.	Base instruction
0x03	ldarg.1	Load argument 1 onto the stack.	Base instruction
0x04	ldarg.2	Load argument 2 onto the stack.	Base instruction
0x05	ldarg.3	Load argument 3 onto the stack.	Base instruction
0x0E	ldarg.s <uint8 (num)>	Load argument numbered num onto the stack, short form.	Base instruction
0xFE 0x0A	ldarga <uint16 (argNum)>	Fetch the address of argument argNum.	Base instruction
0x0F	ldarga.s <uint8 (argNum)>	Fetch the address of argument argNum, short form.	Base instruction
0x20	ldc.i4 <int32 (num)>	Push num of type int32 onto the stack as int32.	Base instruction
0x16	ldc.i4.0	Push 0 onto the stack as int32.	Base instruction
0x17	ldc.i4.1	Push 1 onto the stack as int32.	Base instruction
0x18	ldc.i4.2	Push 2 onto the stack as int32.	Base instruction
0x19	ldc.i4.3	Push 3 onto the stack as int32.	Base instruction
0x1A	ldc.i4.4	Push 4 onto the stack as int32.	Base instruction
0x1B	ldc.i4.5	Push 5 onto the stack as int32.	Base instruction
0x1C	ldc.i4.6	Push 6 onto the stack as int32.	Base instruction
0x1D	ldc.i4.7	Push 7 onto the stack as int32.	Base instruction
0x1E	ldc.i4.8	Push 8 onto the stack as int32.	Base instruction
0x15	ldc.i4.m1	Push -1 onto the stack as int32.	Base instruction
0x15	ldc.i4.M1	Push -1 onto the stack as int32 (alias for ldc.i4.m1).	Base instruction
0x1F	ldc.i4.s <int8 (num)>	Push num onto the stack as int32, short form.	Base instruction
0x21	ldc.i8 <int64 (num)>	Push num of type int64 onto the stack as int64.	Base instruction
0x22	ldc.r4 <float32 (num)>	Push num of type float32 onto the stack as F.	Base instruction
0x23	ldc.r8 <float64 (num)>	Push num of type float64 onto the stack as F.	Base instruction
0xA3	ldelem <typeTok>	Load the element at index onto the top of the stack.	Object model instruction
0x97	ldelem.i	Load the element with type native int at index onto the top of the stack as a native int.	Object model instruction
0x90	ldelem.i1	Load the element with type int8 at index onto the top of the stack as an int32.	Object model instruction
0x92	ldelem.i2	Load the element with type int16 at index onto the top of the stack as an int32.	Object model instruction
0x94	ldelem.i4	Load the element with type int32 at index onto the top of the stack as an int32.	Object model instruction
0x96	ldelem.i8	Load the element with type int64 at index onto the top of the stack as an int64.	Object model instruction
0x98	ldelem.r4	Load the element with type float32 at index onto the top of the stack as an F.	Object model instruction
0x99	ldelem.r8	Load the element with type float64 at index onto the top of the stack as an F.	Object model instruction
0x9A	ldelem.ref	Load the element at index onto the top of the stack as an O. The type of the O is the same as the element type of the array pushed on the CIL stack.	Object model instruction
0x91	ldelem.u1	Load the element with type unsigned int8 at index onto the top of the stack as an int32.	Object model instruction
0x93	ldelem.u2	Load the element with type unsigned int16 at index onto the top of the stack as an int32.	Object model instruction
0x95	ldelem.u4	Load the element with type unsigned int32 at index onto the top of the stack as an int32.	Object model instruction
0x96	ldelem.u8	Load the element with type unsigned int64 at index onto the top of the stack as an int64 (alias for ldelem.i8).	Object model instruction
0x8F	ldelema <class>	Load the address of element at index onto the top of the stack.	Object model instruction
0x7B	ldfld <field>	Push the value of field of object (or value type) obj, onto the stack.	Object model instruction
0x7C	ldflda <field>	Push the address of field of object obj on the stack.	Object model instruction
0xFE 0x06	ldftn <method>	Push a pointer to a method referenced by method, on the stack.	Base instruction
0x4D	ldind.i	Indirect load value of type native int as native int on the stack.	Base instruction
0x46	ldind.i1	Indirect load value of type int8 as int32 on the stack.	Base instruction
0x48	ldind.i2	Indirect load value of type int16 as int32 on the stack.	Base instruction
0x4A	ldind.i4	Indirect load value of type int32 as int32 on the stack.	Base instruction
0x4C	ldind.i8	Indirect load value of type int64 as int64 on the stack.	Base instruction
0x4E	ldind.r4	Indirect load value of type float32 as F on the stack.	Base instruction
0x4F	ldind.r8	Indirect load value of type float64 as F on the stack.	Base instruction
0x50	ldind.ref	Indirect load value of type object ref as O on the stack.	Base instruction
0x47	ldind.u1	Indirect load value of type unsigned int8 as int32 on the stack.	Base instruction
0x49	ldind.u2	Indirect load value of type unsigned int16 as int32 on the stack.	Base instruction
0x4B	ldind.u4	Indirect load value of type unsigned int32 as int32 on the stack.	Base instruction
0x4C	ldind.u8	Indirect load value of type unsigned int64 as int64 on the stack (alias for ldind.i8).	Base instruction
0x8E	ldlen	Push the length (of type native unsigned int) of array on the stack.	Object model instruction
0xFE 0x0C	ldloc <uint16 (indx)>	Load local variable of index indx onto stack.	Base instruction
0x06	ldloc.0	Load local variable 0 onto stack.	Base instruction
0x07	ldloc.1	Load local variable 1 onto stack.	Base instruction
0x08	ldloc.2	Load local variable 2 onto stack.	Base instruction
0x09	ldloc.3	Load local variable 3 onto stack.	Base instruction
0x11	ldloc.s <uint8 (indx)>	Load local variable of index indx onto stack, short form.	Base instruction
0xFE 0x0D	ldloca <uint16 (indx)>	Load address of local variable with index indx.	Base instruction
0x12	ldloca.s <uint8 (indx)>	Load address of local variable with index indx, short form.	Base instruction
0x14	ldnull	Push a null reference on the stack.	Base instruction
0x71	ldobj <typeTok>	Copy the value stored at address src to the stack.	Object model instruction
0x7E	ldsfld <field>	Push the value of the static field on the stack.	Object model instruction
0x7F	ldsflda <field>	Push the address of the static field, field, on the stack.	Object model instruction
0x72	ldstr <string>	Push a string object for the literal string.	Object model instruction
0xD0	ldtoken <token>	Convert metadata token to its runtime representation.	Object model instruction
0xFE 0x07	ldvirtftn <method>	Push address of virtual method on the stack.	Object model instruction
0xDD	leave <int32 (target)>	Exit a protected region of code.	Base instruction
0xDE	leave.s <int8 (target)>	Exit a protected region of code, short form.	Base instruction
0xFE 0x0F	localloc	Allocate space from the local memory pool.	Base instruction
0xC6	mkrefany <class>	Push a typed reference to ptr of type class onto the stack.	Object model instruction
0x5A	mul	Multiply values.	Base instruction
0xD8	mul.ovf	Multiply signed integer values. Signed result shall fit in same size.	Base instruction
0xD9	mul.ovf.un	Multiply unsigned integer values. Unsigned result shall fit in same size.	Base instruction
0x65	neg	Negate value.	Base instruction
0x8D	newarr <etype>	Create a new array with elements of type etype.	Object model instruction
0x73	newobj <ctor>	Allocate an uninitialized object or value type and call ctor.	Object model instruction
0xFE 0x19	no. {  typecheck,  rangecheck,  nullcheck  }	The specified fault check(s) normally performed as part of the execution of the subsequent instruction can/shall be skipped.	Prefix to instruction
0x00	nop	Do nothing (No operation).	Base instruction
0x66	not	Bitwise complement.	Base instruction
0x60	or	Bitwise OR of two integer values, returns an integer.	Base instruction
0x26	pop	Pop value from the stack.	Base instruction
0xFE 0x1E	readonly.	Specify that the subsequent array address operation performs no type check at runtime, and that it returns a controlled-mutability managed pointer.	Prefix to instruction
0xFE 0x1D	refanytype	Push the type token stored in a typed reference.	Object model instruction
0xC2	refanyval <type>	Push the address stored in a typed reference.	Object model instruction
0x5D	rem	Remainder when dividing one value by another.	Base instruction
0x5E	rem.un	Remainder when dividing one unsigned value by another.	Base instruction
0x2A	ret	Return from method, possibly with a value.	Base instruction
0xFE 0x1A	rethrow	Rethrow the current exception.	Object model instruction
0x62	shl	Shift an integer left (shifting in zeros), return an integer.	Base instruction
0x63	shr	Shift an integer right (shift in sign), return an integer.	Base instruction
0x64	shr.un	Shift an integer right (shift in zero), return an integer.	Base instruction
0xFE 0x1C	sizeof <typeTok>	Push the size, in bytes, of a type as an unsigned int32.	Object model instruction
0xFE 0x0B	starg <uint16 (num)>	Store value to the argument numbered num.	Base instruction
0x10	starg.s <uint8 (num)>	Store value to the argument numbered num, short form.	Base instruction
0xA4	stelem <typeTok>	Replace array element at index with the value on the stack.	Object model instruction
0x9B	stelem.i	Replace array element at index with the native int value on the stack.	Object model instruction
0x9C	stelem.i1	Replace array element at index with the int8 value on the stack.	Object model instruction
0x9D	stelem.i2	Replace array element at index with the int16 value on the stack.	Object model instruction
0x9E	stelem.i4	Replace array element at index with the int32 value on the stack.	Object model instruction
0x9F	stelem.i8	Replace array element at index with the int64 value on the stack.	Object model instruction
0xA0	stelem.r4	Replace array element at index with the float32 value on the stack.	Object model instruction
0xA1	stelem.r8	Replace array element at index with the float64 value on the stack.	Object model instruction
0xA2	stelem.ref	Replace array element at index with the ref value on the stack.	Object model instruction
0x7D	stfld <field>	Replace the value of field of the object obj with value.	Object model instruction
0xDF	stind.i	Store value of type native int into memory at address.	Base instruction
0x52	stind.i1	Store value of type int8 into memory at address.	Base instruction
0x53	stind.i2	Store value of type int16 into memory at address.	Base instruction
0x54	stind.i4	Store value of type int32 into memory at address.	Base instruction
0x55	stind.i8	Store value of type int64 into memory at address.	Base instruction
0x56	stind.r4	Store value of type float32 into memory at address.	Base instruction
0x57	stind.r8	Store value of type float64 into memory at address.	Base instruction
0x51	stind.ref	Store value of type object ref (type O) into memory at address.	Base instruction
0xFE 0x0E	stloc <uint16 (indx)>	Pop a value from stack into local variable indx.	Base instruction
0x0A	stloc.0	Pop a value from stack into local variable 0.	Base instruction
0x0B	stloc.1	Pop a value from stack into local variable 1.	Base instruction
0x0C	stloc.2	Pop a value from stack into local variable 2.	Base instruction
0x0D	stloc.3	Pop a value from stack into local variable 3.	Base instruction
0x13	stloc.s <uint8 (indx)>	Pop a value from stack into local variable indx, short form.	Base instruction
0x81	stobj <typeTok>	Store a value of type typeTok at an address.	Object model instruction
0x80	stsfld <field>	Replace the value of the static field with val.	Object model instruction
0x59	sub	Subtract value2 from value1, returning a new value.	Base instruction
0xDA	sub.ovf	Subtract native int from a native int. Signed result shall fit in same size.	Base instruction
0xDB	sub.ovf.un	Subtract native unsigned int from a native unsigned int. Unsigned result shall fit in same size.	Base instruction
0x45	switch <uint32, int32, int32 (t1..tN)>	Jump to one of n values.	Base instruction
0xFE 0x14	tail.	Subsequent call terminates current method.	Prefix to instruction
0x7A	throw	Throw an exception.	Object model instruction
0xFE 0x12	unaligned. (alignment)	Subsequent pointer instruction might be unaligned.	Prefix to instruction
0x79	unbox <valuetype>	Extract a value-type from obj, its boxed representation, and push a controlled-mutability managed pointer to it to the top of the stack.	Object model instruction
0xA5	unbox.any <typeTok>	Extract a value-type from obj, its boxed representation, and copy to the top of the stack.	Object model instruction
0xFE 0x13	volatile.	Subsequent pointer reference is volatile.	Prefix to instruction
0x61	xor	Bitwise XOR of integer values, returns an integer.	Base instruction

== See also ==
- Common Intermediate Language is the assembly language that uses the instruction set.
- Common Language Infrastructure is the standard in which the Common Intermediate Language is defined.
- .NET Framework is a platform and implementation of the Common Language Infrastructure.
- Mono is a cross-platform open-source implementation of the Common Language Infrastructure.
