= Manifest (CLI) =

In the .NET Framework, an assembly manifest is a text file containing metadata about the code within a CLI assembly. It describes the relationship and dependencies of the components in the assembly, versioning information, scope information and the security permissions required by the assembly.

The manifest information embedded within an assembly can be viewed using IL Disassembler (ILDASM.exe) which is available as part of Microsoft Windows SDK.

An assembly manifest contains detailed metadata that identifies the files comprising the assembly, references to other assemblies on which it depends, and type reference information that maps exported types to the modules containing their declarations and implementations. This metadata enables the Common Language Runtime to enforce version policies, resolve dependencies, and load the appropriate components at runtime.

The manifest also specifies optional strong names and digital signatures, which provide a unique identity for the assembly and help ensure its integrity and authenticity during deployment and runtime.
