= .NET Reflector =

Computer program by Lutz Roeder

- Original author(s): Lutz Roeder
- Developer(s): Red Gate Software
- Stable release: 10.3.0.1936 / 15 October 2020; 4 years ago
- Operating system: Windows 7 or later
- Platform: .NET Framework 4.7.2 or later
- Type: Class browser and decompiler
- License: Proprietary commercial software
- Website: www.reflector.net

.NET Reflector is a class browser, decompiler and static analyzer for software created with .NET Framework, originally written by Lutz Roeder. MSDN Magazine named it as one of the Ten Must-Have utilities for developers, and Scott Hanselman listed it as part of his "Big Ten Life and Work-Changing Utilities".

== Overview ==
It can be used to inspect, navigate, search, analyze, and browse the contents of a CLI component such as an assembly and translates the binary information to a human-readable form. By default Reflector allows decompilation of CLI assemblies into C#, Visual Basic .NET, C++/CLI and Common Intermediate Language and F# (alpha version). Reflector also includes a "Call Tree" that can be used to drill down into intermediate language methods to see what other methods they call. It will show the metadata, resources and XML documentation. .NET Reflector can be used by .NET developers to understand the inner workings of code libraries, to show the differences between two versions of the same assembly, and how the various parts of a CLI application interact with each other. There are a large number of add-ins for Reflector.

.NET Reflector can be used to track down performance problems and bugs, browse classes, and maintain or help become familiar with code bases. Using the Analyzer option, it can also be used to find assembly dependencies, and even windows DLL dependencies. There is a call tree and inheritance-browser. It will pick up the same documentation or comments that are stored in xml files alongside their associated assemblies that are used to drive IntelliSense inside Visual Studio. It is even possible to cross-navigate related documentation (xmldoc), searching for specific types, members and references. It can be used to effectively convert source code between C# and Visual Basic.

.NET Reflector has been designed to host add-ins to extend its functionality, many of which are open source. Some of these add-ins provide other languages that can be disassembled too, such as PowerShell, Delphi and MC++. Others analyze assemblies in different ways, providing quality metrics, sequence diagrams, class diagrams, dependency structure matrices or dependency graphs. It is possible to use add-ins to search text, save disassembled code to disk, export an assembly to XMI/UML, compare different versions, or search code. Other add-ins allow debugging processes. Some add-ins are designed to facilitate testing by creating stubs and wrappers.

== History ==
.NET Reflector was originally developed by Lutz Roeder as freeware. Its first versions can be tracked back to January 2001.

Archive.org hosts a collection of the early versions of Reflector.

On 20 August 2008, Red Gate Software announced they were taking responsibility for future development of the software.

In February 2010 Red Gate released .NET Reflector 6 along with a commercial Pro edition that enabled users to step into decompiled code in the Visual Studio debugger as if it were their own source code.

On 10 January 2011 Red Gate announced that .NET Reflector 7 would incorporate Jason Haley's PowerCommands add-in.

On 1 February 2011 Red Gate announced that .NET Reflector would become a commercial product as of version 7, which was released on 14 March 2011. This led to the creation of several free alternatives, including dotPeek, CodeReflect and the open source program ILSpy. Subsequently, on 26 April 2011, due to community feedback Red Gate announced that they would continue to make .NET Reflector 6 available for free to existing users (while new users will have to pay for Reflector).
