= MSIL =

MSIL can mean:

- Microsoft Intermediate Language, a programming language that has been standardized later as the Common Intermediate Language
- Multi Service Interconnect Link, a type of interconnect in BT Wholesale's service architecture
- Maruti Suzuki India Limited
