= Excelsior JET =

- Developer: Excelsior LLC
- Release: 2000; 26 years ago
- Final release: 15.3 / November 22, 2018; 7 years ago
- Written in: Modula-2, Oberon-2, Java, Scala, C++, Assembly
- Operating system: Windows, macOS, and Linux
- Platform: IA-32, AMD64, and ARM
- Type: Ahead-of-time (AOT) native code compiler, runtime, and deployment toolkit for Java applications
- License: EULA
- Website: web.archive.org/web/20190715201408/https://www.excelsiorjet.com/ (archived 2019-07-15)

Excelsior JET is a now-defunct proprietary Java SE technology implementation built around an ahead-of-time (AOT) Java to native code compiler. The compiler transforms the portable Java bytecode into optimized executables for the desired hardware and operating system (OS). Also included are a Java runtime featuring a just-in-time (JIT) compiler for handling classes that were not precompiled for whatever reason (e.g. third-party plugins or dynamic proxies), the complete Java SE API implementation licensed from Oracle, and a toolkit to aid deployment of the optimized applications. Excelsior JET was developed by Excelsior LLC, headquartered in Novosibirsk, Russia.

== Overview ==
Excelsior JET passed the "official" test suite (TCK) for Java SE 8, and was certified Java Compatible on macOS and a number of Windows and Linux flavors running on Intel x86, AMD64/Intel 64, and compatible hardware. (The macOS version was 64-bit only.)

The Enterprise Edition supported the Equinox OSGi runtime at the JVM level, enabling ahead-of-time compilation of Eclipse RCP (Rich Client Platform) applications, and version 7.0 added such support for Web applications running on Apache Tomcat. Version 10.5 introduced a new garbage collector optimized for multi-core and multi-CPU systems

Excelsior JET Embedded implements the Java SE for Embedded technology in a very similar manner. The only major differences used to be in licensing and pricing, but as of the latest version Excelsior JET Embedded also supports ARM-based platforms.

== Latest Release ==
Version 15 introduced incremental compilation for AMD64 and ARM targets and improved application performance across all platforms.

== Product EOL ==
On May 15, 2019, Excelsior announced discontinuation of Excelsior JET in an e-mail to their customers and next day (May 16, 2019) also on their website. Support was announced to be stopped and the engineering team to leave completely within only ~2 weeks ("early June 2019") and Website for downloads announced to be offline mid of June (within only ~4 weeks). At August 7, 2019, it was announced Excelsior was acquired by Huawei.

== See also ==
- GNU Compiler for Java (removed from GCC in October 2016)
