= Mewburn Ellis =

Law firms of the United Kingdom

- Headquarters: London
- No. of offices: 5
- Offices: London, Cambridge, Bristol, Manchester, Munich
- No. of attorneys: 109
- No. of employees: 352
- Major practice areas: Intellectual Property
- Key people: Richard Clegg (Managing Partner)
- Date founded: 1867
- Founder: John Clayton Mewburn
- Company type: Limited liability partnership
- Website: www.mewburn.com

Mewburn Ellis LLP is a European intellectual property law firm. It is one of the UK's largest firms of Chartered Patent Attorneys, European Patent Attorneys, European Trade Mark Attorneys and European Design Attorneys, with offices in London, Bristol, Manchester, Cambridge and Munich.

It has around 100 qualified patent and trade mark attorneys, including 49 partners.

The firm's main practice areas include chemistry, electronics, computing, telecommunications, mechanical engineering and trade marks as well as a large biotechnology and pharmaceutical practice. The firm also undertakes work in areas such as nanotechnology, medical technology, agricultural science and transport.

Mewburn Ellis LLP is ranked as first tier in the Legal 500 directory for patent practice and is featured in the Chambers directory.

== History ==
The firm of Mewburn Ellis LLP traces its origins to the partnership of John Clayton Mewburn and George Beloe Ellis, formed in the 1860s under the name Mewburn Ellis & Co. John Clayton Mewburn was a signatory of the Royal Charter granted to the Chartered Institute of Patent Attorneys in 1891. Since that time, six members of the Ellis family have been partners in the firm, including George Ellis's daughter, Margaret Dixon, who was the first woman to practise as a UK patent agent. The last member of the Ellis family to work at the firm retired in 1988, although the firm still bears the name of its founding partners.

== Offices ==
- London (headquarters)
- Bristol
- Manchester
- Cambridge
- Munich

== Publications and articles ==
Patent attorneys from Mewburn Ellis have featured in various news articles about Green IP, including in national newspapers such as The Independent and The Times as well as written blogs and forward features.
