= Redgate =

British software company

Coordinates: 52°13′46″N 0°9′3″E

Redgate Software Ltd
- Type: Privately held company
- Industry: Information technology
- Founded: 1 October 1999; 27 years ago in Cambridge, England, UK
- Founders: Neil Davidson and Simon Galbraith
- Headquarters: Cambridge Business Park, Cambridge, England
- Area served: Global
- Key people: Jakub Lamik (CEO)
- Products: Development tools including Redgate Flyway, Redgate Monitor, Redgate Test Data Manager, SQL Toolbelt Essentials, SQL Prompt, SQL Search, Schema Compare for Oracle, and Data Masker
- Number of employees: 500 (2024)
- Website: www.red-gate.com

Redgate Software is a software company based in Cambridge, England. It develops tools for developers and data professionals and maintains community websites. The company describes itself as offering end-to-end Database DevOps to help organizations streamline software development and get value from their data faster.

Redgate produces database management tools for Microsoft SQL Server, PostgreSQL, Oracle, MySQL and Microsoft Azure. It also produces advanced developer tools for .NET Framework, such as SmartAssembly and .NET Reflector.

From 2007 to 2013, Redgate was featured in the Sunday Times 100 best companies to work for in the United Kingdom. It has won numerous industry awards for its SQL Server management software.

== History ==
The company was founded by Neil Davidson and Simon Galbraith in October 1999. It is named after Via Porta Rossa (Red Gate Street) in Florence, Italy, close to where Davidson used to live.

On 20 August 2008, Redgate announced it was taking responsibility for future development of the free tool .NET Reflector.

On 22 March 2010, HyperBac Technologies (formerly known as Xceleon Technologies) was acquired by Redgate.

In 2010, Redgate re-launched Springboard with a different model where teams would again receive investment and mentoring, but this time in exchange for an equity stake. One such recipient of investment-for-equity in 2016 was Berlin-based 3T Software Labs, makers of Studio 3T, the IDE for MongoDB, a popular NoSQL database.

In 2016, the company's investment arm, Redgate Investments Ltd, was spun out with Galbraith as the main shareholder. Following a buyout of minority shareholders, Galbraith became the sole shareholder and the company changed its name to Cade Hill Investments Ltd.

On 7 March 2017, Microsoft announced the inclusion of Redgate tools in Visual Studio 2017. Three components were included: ReadyRoll Core and SQL Prompt Core, both in the Enterprise edition of Visual Studio 2017, and SQL Search in all editions.

In December 2021, Redgate announced that Jakub Lamik was taking up the position as CEO of the company, and that Galbraith would remain on the board as a non-executive director.
