= Ahead-of-time compilation =

Computer code compilation strategy

In computer science, ahead-of-time compilation (AOT compilation) is the act of compiling an (often) higher-level programming language into an (often) lower-level language before execution of a program, usually at build-time, to reduce the amount of work needed to be performed at run time.

It is most commonly associated with the act of compiling a higher-level programming language such as C or C++, or an intermediate representation such as Java bytecode or Common Intermediate Language (CIL) code, into native machine code so that the resulting binary file can execute natively, just like a standard native compiler. When being used in this context, it is often seen as an opposite of just-in-time (JIT) compiling.

Speaking more generally, the target languages of an AOT compilation are not necessarily specific to native machine code but are defined rather arbitrarily. Some academic papers use this word to mean the act of compiling the Java bytecode to C or the timing when optimization pipeline are performed. An academic project uses this word to mean the act of pre-compiling JavaScript to a machine-dependent optimized IR for V8 (JavaScript engine) and to a machine independent bytecode for JavaScriptCore. Some industrial language implementations (e.g. Clojure and Hermes JavaScript engine) use this word to mean the act of pre-compiling the source language to VM specific bytecode. Angular (web framework) uses this word to mean converting its HTML template and TypeScript to JavaScript.

In fact, since all static compilation is technically performed ahead of time, this particular wording is often used to emphasize examples where there are significant performance advantages over the act of such pre-compiling. The act of compiling Java to Java bytecode is hence rarely referred to as AOT since it is usually a requirement, not an optimization.

== Reduced runtime overhead ==
Some programming languages with a managed code runtime that can be compiled to an intermediate representation use just-in-time (JIT) compiling. This briefly compiles intermediate code into machine code for a native run while the intermediate code is executing which may slow an application's performance. Ahead-of-time compiling eliminates the need for this step by occurring before execution rather than during execution.

Ahead-of-time compiling for dynamically typed languages to native machine code or other static VM bytecode is possible in a limited number of cases only. For example, the High Performance Erlang Project (HiPE) AOT compiler for the language Erlang can do this because of advanced static type reconstruction techniques and type speculations.

In most situations with fully AOT compiled programs and libraries, it is possible to remove part of a runtime environment, thus saving disk space, memory, battery life, and startup times (no JIT warmup phase), etc. Because of this, it can be useful in embedded or mobile devices.

== Performance trade-offs ==
AOT compilers can perform complex and advanced code optimizations which in most cases of JITing will be considered much too costly. In contrast, AOT usually cannot perform some optimizations possible in JIT like runtime profile-guided optimization (PGO), pseudo-constant propagation, or indirect-virtual function inlining. AOT must compile to a target architecture while a JIT can compile the code to make the best use of the actual CPU it is running on, even years after the software has been released.

Further, JIT compilers can speculatively optimize hot code by making assumptions on the code. The generated code can be deoptimized if a speculative assumption later proves wrong. Such operation slows the performance of the running software until code is optimized again by adaptive optimization. An AOT compiler cannot make such assumptions and needs to infer as much information as possible at compile time. It needs to resort to less specialized code because it cannot know what types will go through a method. Such problems can be alleviated by profile-guided optimizations. But even in this case, the generated code cannot be adapted dynamically to the changing runtime profile as a JIT compiler would do.

== See also ==
- asm.js compiler (JavaScript)
- Bartok (CIL)
- Excelsior JET (Java)
- GNU Compiler for Java
- IL2CPU (CIL)
- Native Image Generator (CIL)
- RubyMotion (Ruby)
