= C++/WinRT =

Windows Runtime library for C++

- Original author: Kenny Kerr
- Developer: Microsoft
- Release: June 23, 2015 (11 years ago)
- Stable release: 3.0.260818.1 / 19 August 2026; 2 days ago
- Written in: C++
- Operating system: Microsoft Windows
- Predecessor: C++/CX, WRL
- Type: Software development tools
- License: MIT License
- Website: aka.ms/cppwinrt
- Repository: github.com/Microsoft/cppwinrt

C++/WinRT is a C++ library for Microsoft's Windows Runtime platform, designed to provide access to modern Windows APIs. C++/WinRT is provided as a standard header file library (with a minimum version of C++17), unlike C++/CX, which is an extension to C++ and requires a recent version of Microsoft Visual C++.

C++/WinRT was introduced as part of the Microsoft Windows SDK in version 10.0.17134.0 (Windows 10, version 1803) and is a component of Windows App SDK (formerly known as Project Reunion). Microsoft Visual Studio support for C++/WinRT is provided by an officially-supported extension.

C++/WinRT was originally released in 2015 by Kenny Kerr, who shortly afterward joined Microsoft. C++/WinRT is now Microsoft's recommended replacement for both the Windows Runtime C++ Template Library (WRL), and for C++/CX.

== Overview ==
Microsoft's Windows Runtime is based on Component Object Model (COM) APIs, and is designed to be accessed through language projections. A language projection hides the COM details, and provides a more natural programming experience for a given language. For C++ developers, C++/WinRT is the officially supported, modern C++ language projection. In addition to being a header-only library, modules are offered (as winrt.*), with one module per WinRT namespace.

As of version 10.0.17134.0 (Windows 10, version 1803), the Microsoft Windows SDK contains a header-file-based standard C++ library for consuming first-party Windows APIs (that is, Windows Runtime APIs in Windows namespaces). C++/WinRT also ships with the cppwinrt.exe tool, which can be pointed at a Windows Runtime metadata (.winmd) file to generate a header-file-based standard C++ library that projects the APIs described in the metadata for consumption from C++/WinRT code. Windows Runtime metadata (.winmd) files provide a canonical way of describing a Windows Runtime API surface. By pointing the cppwinrt.exe tool at metadata, users can generate a library for use with any runtime class implemented in a second- or third-party Windows Runtime component, or implemented in their own application.

With C++/WinRT, users can also implement their own runtime classes using standard C++, without resorting to COM-style programming. For a runtime class, types can be described in a MIDL file (.idl), and from that file the midl.exe and cppwinrt.exe tools generate the implementation boilerplate source code files, ready for users to add their own implementation. Alternatively, users can just implement interfaces by deriving from a base class that's part of the C++/WinRT header library. These techniques employ the curiously recurring template pattern for function-calling via static dispatch. C++/WinRT makes use of C++ language features that were not available when C++/WinRT's predecessors (WRL and C++/CX) were designed, such as modules and coroutines.

A call to winrt::init_apartment() is needed to initialize the thread and COM in the Windows Runtime in a multithreaded apartment (equivalent to calling ::RoInitialize() in <roapi.h>).

C++/WinRT supports asynchronous operation using coroutines. It offers asynchronous types like Windows::Foundation::IAsyncAction and Windows::Foundation::IAsyncOperation<T>. The main method in C++ itself may not be a coroutine, and thus asynchronous calls inside main() must be blocked using the get() method.

== Example ==
The following is a program which spawns a pop-up dialog box.

import winrt.Windows.Foundation;
import winrt.Windows.UI.Popups;

using namespace winrt;
using Windows::Foundation::IAsyncAction;
using Windows::UI::Popups::MessageDialog;

IAsyncAction MainAsync() {
    MessageDialog dialog(L"Hello, world!");
    co_await dialog.ShowAsync();
}

int main(int argc, char* argv[]) {
    // initialize COM/WinRT apartment thread
    winrt::init_apartment();

    // Start coroutine function
    // Block main thread until popup is closed
    MainAsync().get();
}

== History ==
Design and development of C++/WinRT was begun in 2014 by the then-independent software developer Kenny Kerr. At the time, the prevailing way for developers to call Windows Runtime APIs using C++ was with the C++/CX language projection. C++/CX adds non-standard extensions to the C++ language, such as the ref new and ^ (hat) notation inherited from C++/CLI. It hadn't been fully appreciated then that advances in ISO C++ language features meant that it had become possible to design a Windows Runtime language projection for standard C++, without extensions. "There are a lot of very experienced C++ developers at Microsoft who have spent decades-long careers working with C++ and COM," Kerr says. "I think it took someone who didn't realize that it was impossible to just try it anyway and show that it works."

"I had had some previous experience projecting COM APIs into modern C++, so I decided to see whether I could apply those same techniques to the Windows Runtime." One early challenge in developing C++/WinRT was managing the trade-offs that the Windows Runtime makes to support projections for JavaScript and managed .NET languages out of the box. The complexity in the way that generic collections work across language projections is another example of these design challenges, as was coming up with an efficient way for standard C++ to handle the Windows Runtime's interface-versioning model. "It really pushed my understanding of C++ at that time, and it's since pushed the Microsoft Visual C++ compiler to more efficiently handle such techniques at this scale."

Kenny Kerr stated in September of 2022 that C++/WinRT has been put into maintenance mode and will not be adding any new features, and that there were no further plans for a C++/WinRT version 3, further saying that "cppwinrt has reached all of its goals and is generally considered complete and largely bug-free". The "Windows Implementation Library" (WIL), also by Microsoft, was described as a complementary library which may receive additional helpers in the meantime. Despite this, a 3.0 release was made on 22 May 2026.

== See also ==
- C++/CX
- C++/CLI
