= Visual C =

Visual C may refer to:

- Visual C++, an integrated development environment (IDE) product from Microsoft for the C, C++, and C++/CLI programming languages
- Visual C Sharp, Microsoft's implementation of the C# specification, included in the Microsoft Visual Studio suite of product
