= Microsoft Visual C++ =

Integrated development environment product

Visual C++
- Developer: Microsoft
- Initial release: February 1993; 33 years ago
- Stable release: 14.51 (Build 36247) / June 15, 2026; 1 day ago
- Written in: C++
- Operating system: Windows
- Platform: IA-32, x86-64 and ARM
- Available in: English, Chinese (Simplified & Traditional), Czech, French, German, Italian, Japanese, Korean, Polish, Portuguese (Brazilian), Russian, Spanish, Turkish
- Type: Compiler
- License: Trialware and freeware
- Website: visualstudio.microsoft.com/vs/features/cplusplus/

Microsoft Visual C++ (MSVC) is a compiler for the C, C++, C++/CLI and C++/CX programming languages by Microsoft. MSVC is proprietary software; it was originally a standalone product but later became a part of Visual Studio and made available in both trialware and freeware forms. It features tools for developing and debugging C++ code, especially code written for the Windows API, DirectX and .NET.

Many applications require redistributable Visual C++ runtime library packages to function correctly. These packages are frequently installed separately from the applications they support, enabling multiple applications to use the package with only a single installation. These Visual C++ redistributable and runtime packages are mostly installed for standard libraries that many applications use.

== History ==
The predecessor to Visual C++ was called Microsoft C/C++. There was also a Microsoft QuickC 2.5 and a Microsoft QuickC for Windows 1.0. The Visual C++ compiler is still known as Microsoft C/C++ and as of the release of Visual C++ 2015 Update 2, is on version 14.0.23918.0.

=== 16-bit versions ===
- Microsoft C 1.0, based on Lattice C, was Microsoft's first C product in 1983. It was not K&R C compliant.
- C 2.0 added large model support, allowing up to 1MiB for both the Code Segment and Data Segment.
- C 3.0 was the first version developed inside Microsoft. This version intended compatibility with K&R and the later ANSI standard. It was being used inside Microsoft (for Windows and Xenix development) in early 1984. It shipped as a product in 1985.
- C 4.0 added optimizations and CodeView, a source-level debugger.
- C 5.0 added loop optimizations and huge memory model (arrays bigger than 64 KB) support.
- C 5.1 released in 1988 allowed compiling programs for OS/2 1.x. The fourteen 5.25" disk (two of which were 1.2 MB, the others 360k) version included QuickC. The eleven 720k 3.5" disk version included with the OS/2 Software Development Kit included MASM 5.1 (a single executable that worked under both MSDOS and OS/2 1.x).
- C 6.0 released in 1989 added support for tiny memory model and better support for the ANSI C89 standard (the documentation explicitly says that it is not 100% compliant but it appears to be close enough for practical purposes). It added the Programmer's Workbench IDE, global flow analysis, a source browser, and a new debugger. To the surprise of many, C++ was not included even though competitors already had offerings.
- C/C++ 7.0 was released in 1992. Dropped OS/2 support. Compilation required a 386 processor plus the included DOS extender, 386MAX, though for users to be able to target DOS extenders in their own programs they write, one of several later-released third-party tools was required. Added built-in support for C++ and MFC (Microsoft Foundation Class Library) 1.0.
- Visual C++ 1.0, which included MFC 2.0, was the first version of "Visual" C++, released in February 1993. It was Cfront 2.1 compliant and available in two editions:
  - Standard: replaced QuickC for Windows.
  - Professional: replaced C/C++ 7.0. Included the ability to build both DOS and Windows applications, an optimizing compiler, a source profiler, and the Windows 3.1 SDK. The Phar Lap 286 DOS Extender Lite was also included.
- Visual C++ 1.5 was released in December 1993, included MFC 2.5, and added OLE 2.0 and ODBC support to MFC. It was the first version of Visual C++ that came only on CD-ROM.
  - Visual C++ 1.51 and 1.52 were available as part of a subscription service.
  - Visual C++ 1.52b is similar to 1.52, but does not include the Control Development Kit.
  - Visual C++ 1.52c was a patched version of 1.5. It is the last, and arguably most popular, development platform for Microsoft Windows 3.x. It is available through Microsoft Developer Network.

=== Strictly 32-bit versions ===
- Visual C++ 1.0 (original name: Visual C++ 32-bit Edition) released in 1993 was the first version for 32-bit development (and requiring 32-bit Windows NT as a host) for the Intel 386 architecture. Although released when 16-bit version 1.5 was available, it did not include support for OLE2 and ODBC. It was also available in a bundle called Visual C++ 16/32-bit Suite, which included Visual C++ 1.5.
- Visual C++ 2.0, which included MFC 3.0, was the first version to be 32-bit only. In many ways, this version was ahead of its time, since Windows 95, then codenamed "Chicago", was not yet released, and Windows NT had only a small market share. Microsoft included and updated Visual C++ 1.5 as part of the 2.x releases up to 2.1, which included Visual C++ 1.52, and both 16-bit and 32-bit version of the Control Development Kit (CDK) were included. Visual C++ 2.x also supported Win32s development. It is available through Microsoft Developer Network. There was a Visual C++ 2.0 RISC Edition for MIPS and Alpha processors, as well as a cross-platform edition for the Macintosh (68000 instruction set).
  - Microsoft Visual C++ Cross-Development Edition for the Macintosh was an add-on for Visual C++ that introduced the Windows Portability Library, originally known as Windows Library for Macintosh or Windows Layer for the Macintosh (WLM), allowing developers to write applications against the Win32 and MFC APIs that could be compiled for 68000 architecture Macintosh computers.
  - Visual C++ 2.1 and 2.2 were updates for 2.0 available through subscription.
- Visual C++ 4.0, released on 1995-12-11, introduced the Developer Studio IDE. Its then-novel tiled layout of non-overlapping panels—navigation panel, combination editor/source level debugger panel, and console output panel—continues through the Visual Studio product line (as of 2025). Visual C++ 4.0 included MFC 4.0, was designed for Windows 95 and Windows NT. To allow support of legacy (Windows 3.x/DOS) projects, 4.0 came bundled with the Visual C++ 1.52 installation CD. Updates available through subscription included Visual C++ 4.1, which came with the Microsoft Game SDK (later released separately as the DirectX SDK), and Visual C++ 4.2. Version number 3.0 was skipped to achieve version number parity between Visual C++ 4.0 and MFC 4.0.
- Visual C++ 4.2 did not support Windows 3.x (Win32s) development. This was the final version with a cross-platform edition for the Mac available and it differed from the 2.x version in that it also allowed compilation for the PowerPC instruction set.
- Visual C++ 5.0 (bundled with Visual Studio 97) which included MFC 4.21 and was released 1997-04-28, was a major upgrade from 4.2. Available in four editions: Learning, Professional, Enterprise, and RISC.
- Visual C++ 6.0 (commonly known as VC6, and available standalone in Standard, Professional and Enterprise editions, as well as bundled with Visual Studio 6.0), which included MFC 6.0, was released in 1998. The release was somewhat controversial since it did not include an expected update to MFC. Visual C++ 6.0 is still quite popular and often used to maintain legacy projects. There are, however, issues with this version under Windows XP, especially under the debugging mode (for example, the values of static variables do not display). The debugging issues can be solved with a patch called the "Visual C++ 6.0 Processor Pack". Version number: 12.00.8804
- Visual C++ .NET 2002 (also known as Visual C++ 7.0), which included MFC 7.0, was released in 2002 with support for link time code generation and debugging runtime checks, .NET 1.0, and Visual C# and Managed C++. The new user interface used many of the hot keys and conventions of Visual Basic, which accounted for some of its unpopularity among C++ developers. Version number: 13.00.9466
- Visual C++ .NET 2003 (also known as Visual C++ 7.1), which included MFC 7.1, was released in 2003 along with .NET 1.1 and was a major upgrade to Visual C++ .NET 2002, and was the first version to support the C99 "long long" construct. It was considered a patch to Visual C++ .NET 2002. Accordingly, the English language upgrade version of Visual Studio .NET 2003 shipped for minimal cost to owners of the English-language version of Visual Studio .NET 2002. Windows 98 is the lowest officially supported version. Although simple programs will work on Windows 95 and NT 4.0, more complex programs may cause things like ws2_32.dll to be referenced, or functions missing in kernel32.dll. In later versions (Visual C++ 2005) of the compiler even simple programs won't work (unless you replace the C library) because they have a reference to function IsDebuggerPresent in kernel32.dll which only exists in Windows 98 and later. Version number: 13.10.3077
- eMbedded Visual C++ in various versions was used to develop for some versions of the Windows CE operating system. Initially it replaced a development environment consisting of tools added onto Visual C++ 6.0. eMbedded Visual C++ was replaced as a separate development environment by Microsoft Visual Studio 2005.

=== 32-bit and 64-bit versions ===
- Visual C++ 2005 (also known as Visual C++ 8.0), which included MFC 8.0, was released in November 2005. This version supports .NET 2.0 and includes a new version of C++ targeted to the .NET framework (C++/CLI) with the purpose of replacing the previous version (Managed C++). Managed C++ for CLI is still available via compiler options, though. It also introduced OpenMP. With Visual C++ 2005, Microsoft also introduced Team Foundation Server. Visual C++ 8.0 has problems compiling MFC AppWizard projects that were created using Visual Studio 6.0, so maintenance of legacy projects can be continued with the original IDE if rewriting is not feasible. Visual C++ 2005 is the last version able to target Windows 98 and Windows Me. SP1 version (14.00.50727.762) is also available in Microsoft Windows SDK Update for Windows Vista.
- Visual C++ 2008 (also known as Visual C++ 9.0) was released in November 2007. This version supports .NET 3.5. Managed C++ for CLI is still available via compiler options. By default, all applications compiled against the Visual C++ 2008 Runtimes (static and dynamic linking) will only work on Windows 2000, Windows XP SP2 and later. A feature pack released for VC9, later included in SP1, added support for C++ TR1 library extensions. SP1 version (15.00.30729.01) is also available in Microsoft Windows SDK for Windows 7.
- Some versions of Visual C++ supported Itanium 2.
- Visual C++ 2010 (also known as Visual C++ 10.0) was released on April 12, 2010. It uses a SQL Server Compact database to store information about the source code, including IntelliSense information, for better IntelliSense and code-completion support. However, Visual C++ 2010 does not support Intellisense for C++/CLI. This version adds a C++ parallel computing library called the Parallel Patterns Library, partial support for C++11, significantly improved IntelliSense based on the Edison Design Group front end, and performance improvements to both the compiler and generated code. This version is built on .NET 4.0, but supports compiling to machine code. The partial C++11 support mainly consists of six compiler features: lambdas, rvalue references, auto, decltype, static_assert, and nullptr. C++11 also supports library features (e.g., moving the TR1 components from std::tr1 namespace directly to std namespace). Variadic templates were also considered, but delayed until some future version due to having a lower priority, which stemmed from the fact that, unlike other costly-to-implement features (lambda, rvalue references), variadic templates would benefit only a minority of library writers rather than the majority of compiler end users. By default, all applications compiled against Visual C++ 2010 Runtimes only work on Windows XP SP2 and later. The RTM version (16.00.30319) is also available in Windows SDK for Windows 7 and .NET Framework 4 (WinSDK v7.1). SP1 version (16.00.40219) is available as part of Visual Studio 2010 Service Pack 1 or through the Microsoft Visual C++ 2010 Service Pack 1 Compiler Update for the Windows SDK 7.1.
- Visual C++ 2012 (also known as Visual C++ 11.0) was released on August 15, 2012. It features improved C++11 support, and support for Windows Runtime development.
- Visual C++ 2013 (also known as Visual C++ 12.0) was released on October 17, 2013. It features further C++11 and C99 support, and introduces a REST SDK.
- Visual C++ 2015 (also known as Visual C++ 14.0) was released on July 20, 2015. It features improved C++11/14/17 support. Without any announcement from Microsoft, Visual Studio 2015 Update 2 started generating telemetry calls in compiled binaries. After some users contacted Microsoft about this problem, Microsoft said they would remove these telemetry calls when compiling with the future Visual Studio 2015 Update 3. The function in question was removed from the Visual C++ CRT static libraries in Visual Studio 2015 Update 3.
- Visual C++ 2017 (also known as Visual C++ 14.10) was released on March 7, 2017.
- Visual C++ 2019 (also known as Visual C++ 14.20) was released on April 2, 2019.

=== Strictly 64-bit versions ===
- Visual C++ 2022 (also known as Visual C++ 14.30) was released on November 8, 2021.
- Visual C++ 2022 (also known as Visual C++ 14.40) was released on May 21, 2024.
- Visual C++ 2026 (also known as Visual C++ 14.50) was released on November 11, 2025.

=== Internal version numbering ===
There are several different version numbers to consider when working with Visual C or C++. The oldest and most original of these is the compiler version number, which has been monotonically increased since the early Microsoft C compiler days. This is the version returned by running the command cl.exe on its own without any options. By taking two digits after the decimal and dropping the decimal point, this also becomes the value of the C pre-processor macro: _MSC_VER, and the CMake variable: MSVC_VERSION. A longer version of the C macro is _MSC_FULL_VER to make more finely-grained distinctions between builds of the compiler. An example of _MSC_VER is 1933 to represent version 19.33 of the Microsoft C/C++ compiler, and of _MSC_FULL_VER is 193331630.

The Visual product version, such as "17.3.4", designates the version of Visual Studio with which version 19.33 of the compiler was packaged. Then there is the Microsoft Visual C/C++ Runtime Library version, e.g. "14.3". From this, one can also deduce the toolset version, which can be obtained by taking the first three digits of the runtime library version and dropping the decimal, e.g. "143". It includes the Visual C/C++ runtime library, as well as compilers, linkers, assemblers, other build tools, and matching libraries and header files. The following is a (scrapeable) table of the known correlated version numbers.

Visual Studio Versions
product name	VC ( Version Code )	marketing year	_MSC_VER	_MSC_FULL_VER	runtime library version
Microsoft C 6.0			600		
Microsoft C/C++ 7.0			700		
Visual C++ 1.0	1.0		800		1
Visual C++ 2.0	2.0		900		2
Visual C++ 4.0	4.0		1000		4
Visual C++ 4.1	4.1		1010		4.1
Visual C++ 4.2	4.2		1020		4.2
Visual Studio 97 [5.0]	5.0	97	1100		5
Visual Studio 6.0 SP5	6.0		1200	12008804	6
Visual Studio 6.0 SP6	6.0		1200	12008804	6
Visual Studio .NET 2002 [7.0]	7.0	2002	1300	13009466	7
Visual Studio .NET 2003 Beta [7.1]	7.1	2003	1310	13102292	7.1
Visual Studio Toolkit 2003 [7.1]	7.1	2003	1310	13103052	7.1
Visual Studio .NET 2003 [7.1]	7.1	2003	1310	13103077	7.1
Visual Studio .NET 2003 SP1 [7.1]	7.1	2003	1310	13106030	7.1
Visual Studio 2005 Beta 1 [8.0]	8.0	2005	1400	140040607	8
Visual Studio 2005 Beta 2 [8.0]	8.0	2005	1400	140050215	8
Visual Studio 2005 [8.0]	8.0	2005	1400	140050320	8
Visual Studio 2005 SP1 [8.0]	8.0	2005	1400	140050727	8
Visual Studio 2008 Beta 2 [9.0]	8.0	2008	1500	150020706	9
Visual Studio 2008 [9.0]	9.0	2010	1500	150021022	9
Visual Studio 2008 SP1 [9.0]	9.0	2010	1500	150030729	9
Visual Studio 2010 Beta 1 [10.0]	10.0	2010	1600	160020506	10
Visual Studio 2010 Beta 2 [10.0]	10.0	2010	1600	160021003	10
Visual Studio 2010 [10.0]	10.0	2010	1600	160030319	10
Visual Studio 2010 SP1 [10.0]	10.0	2010	1600	160040219	10
Visual Studio 2012 [11.0]	11.0	2012	1700	170050727	11
Visual Studio 2012 Update 1 [11.0]	11.0	2012	1700	170051106	11
Visual Studio 2012 Update 2 [11.0]	11.0	2012	1700	170060315	11
Visual Studio 2012 Update 3 [11.0]	11.0	2012	1700	170060610	11
Visual Studio 2012 Update 4 [11.0]	11.0	2012	1700	170061030	11
Visual Studio 2012 November CTP [11.0]	11.0	2012	1700	170051025	11
Visual Studio 2013 Preview [12.0]	12.0	2013	1800	180020617	12
Visual Studio 2013 RC [12.0]	12.0	2013	1800	180020827	12
Visual Studio 2013 [12.0]	12.0	2013	1800	180021005	12
Visual Studio 2013 Update 1 [12.0]	12.0	2013	1800	180021005	12
Visual Studio 2013 Update2 RC [12.0]	12.0	2013	1800	180030324	12
Visual Studio 2013 Update 2 [12.0]	12.0	2013	1800	180030501	12
Visual Studio 2013 Update 3 [12.0]	12.0	2013	1800	180030723	12
Visual Studio 2013 Update 4 [12.0]	12.0	2013	1800	180031101	12
Visual Studio 2013 Update 5 [12.0]	12.0	2013	1800	180040629	12
Visual Studio 2013 November CTP [12.0]	12.0	2013	1800	180021114	12
Visual Studio 2015 [14.0]	14.0	2015	1900	190023026	14
Visual Studio 2015 Update 1 [14.0]	14.0	2015	1900	190023506	14
Visual Studio 2015 Update 2 [14.0]	14.0	2015	1900	190023918	14
Visual Studio 2015 Update 3 [14.0]	14.0	2015	1900	190024210	14
Visual Studio 2017 version 15.0	15.0	2017	1910	191025017	14.1
Visual Studio 2017 version 15.1	15.1	2017	1910	191025017	14.1
Visual Studio 2017 version 15.2	15.2	2017	1910	191025017	14.1
Visual Studio 2017 version 15.3.3	15.3.3	2017	1911	191125507	14.11
Visual Studio 2017 version 15.4.4	15.4.4	2017	1911	191125542	14.11
Visual Studio 2017 version 15.4.5	15.4.5	2017	1911	191125547	14.11
Visual Studio 2017 version 15.5.2	15.5.2	2017	1912	191225831	14.12
Visual Studio 2017 version 15.5.3	15.5.3	2017	1912	191225834	14.12
Visual Studio 2017 version 15.5.4	15.5.4	2017	1912	191225834	14.12
Visual Studio 2017 version 15.5.6	15.5.6	2017	1912	191225835	14.12
Visual Studio 2017 version 15.5.7	15.5.7	2017	1912	191225835	14.12
Visual Studio 2017 version 15.6.0	15.6.0	2017	1913	191326128	14.13
Visual Studio 2017 version 15.6.1	15.6.1	2017	1913	191326128	14.13
Visual Studio 2017 version 15.6.2	15.6.2	2017	1913	191326128	14.13
Visual Studio 2017 version 15.6.3	15.6.3	2017	1913	191326129	14.13
Visual Studio 2017 version 15.6.4	15.6.4	2017	1913	191326129	14.13
Visual Studio 2017 version 15.6.6	15.6.6	2017	1913	191326131	14.13
Visual Studio 2017 version 15.6.7	15.6.7	2017	1913	191326132	14.13
Visual Studio 2017 version 15.7.1	15.7.1	2017	1914	191426428	14.14
Visual Studio 2017 version 15.7.2	15.7.2	2017	1914	191426429	14.14
Visual Studio 2017 version 15.7.3	15.7.3	2017	1914	191426430	14.14
Visual Studio 2017 version 15.7.5	15.7.5	2017	1914	191426433	14.14
Visual Studio 2017 version 15.9.1	15.9.1	2017	1916	191627023	14.16
Visual Studio 2017 version 15.9.4	15.9.4	2017	1916	191627025	14.16
Visual Studio 2017 version 15.9.5	15.9.5	2017	1916	191627026	14.16
Visual Studio 2017 version 15.9.7	15.9.7	2017	1916	191627027	14.16
Visual Studio 2017 version 15.9.11	15.9.11	2017	1916	191627030	14.16
Visual Studio 2019 version 16.0.0	16.0.0	2019	1920	192027508	14.20
Visual Studio 2019 version 16.1.2	16.1.2	2019	1921	192127702	14.21
Visual Studio 2019 version 16.2.3	16.2.3	2019	1922	192227905	14.21
Visual Studio 2019 version 16.3.2	16.3.2	2019	1923	192328105	14.21
Visual Studio 2019 version 16.4.0	16.4.0	2019	1924	192428314	14.24
Visual Studio 2019 version 16.5.1	16.5.1	2019	1925	192528611	14.25
Visual Studio 2019 version 16.6.2	16.6.2	2019	1926	192628806	14.26
Visual Studio 2019 version 16.7	16.7	2019	1927	192729112	14.27
Visual Studio 2019 version 16.8.1	16.8.1	2019	1928	192829333	14.28
Visual Studio 2019 version 16.8.2	16.8.2	2019	1928	192829334	14.28
Visual Studio 2019 version 16.9.0	16.9.0	2019	1928	192829910	14.28
Visual Studio 2019 version 16.9.2	16.9.2	2019	1928	192829913	14.28
Visual Studio 2019 version 16.9.17	16.9.17	2019	1928	192829921	14.28
Visual Studio 2019 version 16.9.18	16.9.18	2019	1928	192829921	14.28
Visual Studio 2019 version 16.9.19	16.9.19	2019	1928	192829923	14.28
Visual Studio 2019 version 16.11.2	16.11.2	2019	1929	192930133	14.29
Visual Studio 2019 version 16.11.8	16.11.8	2019	1929	192930138	14.29
Visual Studio 2019 version 16.11.9	16.11.9	2019	1929	192930139	14.29
Visual Studio 2019 version 16.11.10	16.11.10	2019	1929	192930140	14.29
Visual Studio 2019 version 16.11.11	16.11.11	2019	1929	192930141	14.29
Visual Studio 2019 version 16.11.12	16.11.12	2019	1929	192930142	14.29
Visual Studio 2019 version 16.11.16	16.11.16	2019	1929	192930145	14.29
Visual Studio 2019 version 16.11.17	16.11.17	2019	1929	192930146	14.29
Visual Studio 2019 version 16.11.21	16.11.21	2019	1929	192930147	14.29
Visual Studio 2019 version 16.11.24	16.11.24	2019	1929	192930148	14.29
Visual Studio 2019 version 16.11.27	16.11.27	2019	1929	192930151	14.29
Visual Studio 2019 version 16.11.35	16.11.35	2019	1929	192930154	14.29
Visual Studio 2022 version 17.0.1	17.0.1	2022	1930	193030705	14.30
Visual Studio 2022 version 17.0.2	17.0.2	2022	1930	193030706	14.31
Visual Studio 2022 version 17.1.3	17.1.3	2022	1931	193131105	14.31
Visual Studio 2022 version 17.2.2	17.2.2	2022	1932	193231329	14.32
Visual Studio 2022 version 17.3.4	17.3.4	2022	1933	193331630	14.33
Visual Studio 2022 version 17.4.0	17.4.0	2022	1934	193431933	14.34
Visual Studio 2022 version 17.5.0	17.5.0	2022	1935	193532215	14.35
Visual Studio 2022 version 17.6.0	17.6.0	2022	1936	193632532	14.36
Visual Studio 2022 version 17.6.2	17.6.2	2022	1936	193632532	14.36.32532
Visual Studio 2022 version 17.6.4	17.6.4	2022	1936	193632535	14.36.32532
Visual Studio 2022 version 17.7.0	17.7.0	2022	1937	193732822	14.36.32543
Visual Studio 2022 version 17.8.0	17.8.0	2022	1938	193833130	14.38.33135
Visual Studio 2022 version 17.9.1	17.9.1	2022	1939	193933520	14.39.33520
Visual Studio 2022 version 17.9.6	17.9.6	2022	1939	193933523	14.39.33523
Visual Studio 2022 version 17.10.1	17.10.1	2022	1940	194033811	14.40.33811
Visual Studio 2022 version 17.10.10	17.10.10	2022	1940	194033818	14.40.33818
Visual Studio 2022 version 17.11.0	17.11.0	2022	1941	194134120	14.41.34120
Visual Studio 2022 version 17.12.4	17.12.4	2022	1942	194234436	14.42.34436
Visual Studio 2022 version 17.13.0	17.13.0	2022	1943	194334808	14.43.34808
Visual Studio 2022 version 17.13.6	17.13.6	2022	1943	194334810	14.43.34810

== Compatibility ==
=== ABI ===
The Visual C++ compiler ABI has historically changed between major compiler releases. This is especially the case for STL containers, where container sizes have varied a lot between compiler releases. Microsoft therefore recommends against using C++ interfaces at module boundaries when one wants to enable client code compiled using a different compiler version. Instead of C++, Microsoft recommends using C or COM interfaces, which are designed to have a stable ABI between compiler releases.

All 14.x MSVC releases have a stable ABI, and binaries built with these versions can be mixed in a forwards-compatible manner, noting the following restrictions:

- The toolset version used must be equal to or higher than the highest toolset version used to build any linked binaries.
- The MSVC Redistributable version must be equal to or higher than the toolset version used by any application component.
- Static libraries or object files compiled with /GL (Whole program optimisation) are not binary compatible between versions and must use the exact same toolset.

=== C runtime libraries ===
Visual C++ ships with different versions of C runtime libraries. This means users can compile their code with any of the available libraries. However, this can cause some problems when using different components (DLLs, EXEs) in the same program. A typical example is a program using different libraries. The user should use the same C Run-Time for all the program's components unless the implications are understood. Microsoft recommends using the multithreaded, dynamic link library (/MD or /MDd compiler option) to avoid possible problems.

==== POSIX ====
Although Microsoft's CRT implements a large subset of POSIX interfaces, the Visual C++ compiler will emit a warning on every use of such functions by default. The rationale is that C and C++ standards require an underscore prefix before implementation-defined interfaces, so the use of these functions are non-standard. However, systems that are actually POSIX-compliant would not accept these underscored names, and it is more portable to just turn off the warning instead.

=== C ===
Although the product originated as an IDE for the C programming language, for many years the compiler's support for that language conformed only to the original edition of the C standard, dating from 1989, but not the C99 revision of the standard. There had been no plans to support C99 even in 2011, more than a decade after its publication.

Visual C++ 2013 finally added support for various C99 features in its C mode (including designated initializers, compound literals, and the _Bool type), though it was still not complete. Visual C++ 2015 further improved the C99 support, with full support of the C99 Standard Library, except for features that require C99 language features not yet supported by the compiler.

Most of the changes from the C11 revision of the standard were still not supported by Visual C++ 2017. For example, generic selections via the _Generic keyword are not supported by the compiler and result in a syntax error.

The preprocessor was overhauled in 2018, with C11 in sight:

Full C11 conformance is on our roadmap, and updating the preprocessor is just the first step in that process. The C11 _Generic feature is not actually part of the preprocessor, so it has not yet been implemented. When implemented I expect the feature to work independently of if the traditional or updated preprocessor logic is used.

_Generic support has been committed to MSVC as of February 2020.

In September 2020, Microsoft announced C11 and C17 standards support in MSVC would arrive in version 16.8. This did not include optional features but Microsoft indicated that they were planning to add support for atomics and threads at a later date. In version 17.5, partial (since atomic locks are missing) and experimental (meaning hidden behind the compiler flag /experimental:c11atomics) support for atomics was added and in version 17.8, support for threads was added, this time not behind a compiler flag.

=== C++ ===
With default settings MSVC does not do two-phase name lookup which prevents it from flagging a wide range of invalid code. Most checks are deferred to template instantiation. More recent versions remedy this behavior, but it needs to be enabled by the command-line option /permissive-.

== Reception ==
Describing it as "excellent", BYTE in February 1989 approved of Microsoft C 5.1's OS/2 support, QuickC for interactive development, and CodeView debugger. Although Watcom C produced slightly faster code, the magazine said that developers "might still prefer Microsoft's friendlier and more powerful tools".
