= CAPICOM =

ActiveX control created by Microsoft

CAPICOM is a discontinued ActiveX control created by Microsoft to help expose a select set of Microsoft Cryptographic Application Programming Interface (CryptoAPI) functions through Microsoft Component Object Model (COM). It was intended to enable every environment that supports ActiveX to use Microsoft Cryptographic technologies, including web pages that are opened with Microsoft Internet Explorer or any other web browser that supports ActiveX.

CAPICOM can be used to digitally sign data, display and inspect their digital certificate, verify the validity of their digital signature, add or remove certificates to or from the certificate stores, and encrypt or decrypt data.

CAPICOM Version 2.1.0.3, the latest and last version of CAPICOM, is officially supported on Windows Vista. However, Microsoft has announced that CAPICOM is discontinued and is no longer being developed. Microsoft suggests replacing CAPICOM with .NET Framework's X509 Cryptographic Classes and, in a handful of cases, with Windows API functions.

CAPICOM was not included in Windows SDK for Windows 7.
