= Windows SDK =

Software development kit by Microsoft

- Developer: Microsoft
- Stable release: 10.0.26100.1742 / September 26, 2024; 23 months ago
- Operating system: Microsoft Windows (all versions since 1992)
- Included with: Microsoft Visual Studio
- Type: Software development kit (SDK)
- License: Tooling: Freeware; Docs: Open-source – MIT License or a permissive Creative Commons license
- Website: developer.microsoft.com/windows/downloads/sdk-archive

Windows SDK (formerly known as Microsoft Windows SDK, Microsoft Win32 SDK, and Platform SDK (Note: In chronological order, this software package was known as "Microsoft Windows SDK" (first 1992, then 2006), "Microsoft Win32 SDK" (1993), "Microsoft Platform SDK" (1999), "Windows Platform SDK" (2004), and "Windows Standalone SDK" (2015), and finally "Windows SDK" (first 2013, then 2017).)) is a software development kit (SDK) from Microsoft that contains documentation, header files, libraries, compilers, samples and assorted tools required to develop apps for Microsoft Windows. (Note: These libraries are also distributed as Windows System Files.)

In 2006, several other SDKs for .NET Framework, Microsoft Tablet PCs, and the Windows Media platform were merged into Microsoft Windows SDK serving the developers of .NET Framework 3 through .NET Framework 4.5. The .NET Framework SDK, however, split off in 2013.

== History ==
The first incarnations of the package were Microsoft Windows SDK (with the "Microsoft" prefix) for Windows 3.1x and Microsoft Win32 SDK for Windows NT 3.1, released in 1992 and 1993, respectively.

Platform SDK was released in 1999. It contains compilers, tools, documentations, header files, libraries and samples needed for software development on IA-32, x64 and IA-64 CPU architectures.

Starting with Windows Vista, Platform SDK, as well as the SDKs for Windows PowerShell, .NET Framework, Microsoft Tablet PC, and the Windows Media platform were replaced by a unified Microsoft Windows SDK. The SDK for DirectX was merged much later in 2012, with the release of Windows 8. The Windows Media Center SDK for Windows Vista also shipped separately. The SDK for .NET Framework split off in 2013.

In 2013, the package dropped the "Microsoft" prefix and was released as Windows SDK.

== Features ==
Windows SDK includes documentation, header files, libraries, compilers, samples and assorted tools required for:

- Desktop app development with Windows API
- Desktop app development with .NET Framework and managed code (only between 2006–2013)
- UWP app development using Windows Runtime and Universal Windows Platform
- Web app development using ASP.NET, HTML, CSS and JavaScript
- Language-related topics (such as syntax and conventions) for PowerShell, C++, C#, Visual Basic, and F#. Originally, the documentation included JavaScript, CSS and HTML topics, but they have been removed in favor of MDN Web Docs.

With the inception of Microsoft Learn, the documentations in the SDK were made available under the MIT License or occasionally permissive Creative Commons licenses. For example, in the case of Windows PowerShell 5.1, the documentation's license is Creative Commons Attribution 4.0, while the code license is MIT License.

Windows SDK allows the user to specify the components to be installed and where to install them. It integrates with Visual Studio, so that multiple copies of the components that both have are not installed; however, there are compatibility caveats if either of the two is not from the same era. Information shown can be filtered by content, such as showing only new Windows Vista content, only .NET Framework content, or showing content for a specific language or technology.

Windows SDK is available free of charge. Early versions are available on the Microsoft Download Center but later versions were moved to MSDN in 2012, and now available on MSDN's successor, Microsoft Learn. For a time, the SDK could be ordered on CDs and later DVDs.

A developer might need to use an older SDK. For example, the Windows Server 2003 Platform SDK released in February 2003 was the last SDK to provide full support of Visual Studio 6.0.

== Release details ==
Release details
Name	Version number	Build number	Release date	Download	Notes
Microsoft Windows Software Development Kit	3.1	?	1992		
Microsoft Windows Software Development Kit	3.11	?	?	?	
Microsoft Win32 Software Development Kit	3.1	?	?		
Microsoft Win32 Software Development Kit	3.5	3.50.612.1	1994-04		
Microsoft Win32 Software Development Kit	3.51	?	1995-06		
Microsoft Win32 Software Development Kit	4.0	4.0.1381.1	1996-11		
Microsoft Win32 Software Development Kit	v5.0	5.0.1636.1	1998-06	?	Included in Visual Studio 6
Microsoft Platform SDK October 1998 PDC	?	?	1999-04		MSDN subscription CD-ROM disc. Also known as Windows NT 5.0 Beta 2 PDC Release Edition
Microsoft Platform SDK April 1999	v5.0	5.0.2031.5	1999-04		MSDN subscription CD-ROM disc. Last Platform SDK to officially install on Windows 95
Microsoft Platform SDK July 1999	v5.0	5.0.2072.13	1999-07		MSDN subscription CD-ROM disc. Also known as Microsoft Platform SDK for Windows 2000 RC1
Microsoft Platform SDK September 1999	v5.0	5.0.2128.8	1999-09	,	MSDN subscription CD-ROM disc. Also known as Microsoft Platform SDK for Windows 2000 RC2. Includes Alpha to AXP64 cross toolset. Last Platform SDK to fully support Visual C++ 5.0
Microsoft Platform SDK January 2000	v5.0	?	2000-01	?	MSDN subscription CD-ROM disc.
Microsoft Platform SDK April 2000	v5.0	5.0.2195.32	2000-04		MSDN subscription CD-ROM disc.
Microsoft Platform SDK July 2000	v5.0	5.0.2201.0	2000-07		MSDN subscription CD-ROM disc.
Microsoft Platform SDK November 2000	v5.0	5.0.2296.5	2000-11		MSDN subscription CD-ROM disc. Also known as Microsoft Platform SDK for Whistler Beta 1. Includes preliminary tools for Itanium.
Microsoft Platform SDK February 2001	?	?	2001-02		MSDN subscription CD-ROM disc. Also known as Microsoft Platform SDK for Whistler Beta 2.
Microsoft Platform SDK June 2001	v5.1	5.1.2505.0	2001-06		MSDN subscription CD-ROM disc. Last Platform SDK to officially develop for Windows 95. (Does not officially install on Windows 95)
Microsoft Platform SDK August 2001	v5.1	5.1.2601.0	2001-08	,	MSDN subscription CD-ROM disc. Last Platform SDK to unofficially develop for Windows 95. (Does not officially install on Windows 95)
Microsoft Platform SDK November 2001	v5.2	5.2.3590.2	2001-11		
Microsoft Platform SDK May 2002	v5.2	5.2.3639.1	2002-05		
Microsoft Platform SDK July 2002	v5.2	5.2.3663.0	2002-07		
Microsoft Platform SDK August 2002	v5.2	5.2.3672.1	2002-08		
Microsoft Platform SDK November 2002	v5.2	5.2.3718.1	2002-11		
Microsoft Platform SDK February 2003	v5.2	5.2.3790.0	2003-02		Last version with VC6 support and latest version with Windows 95 and Windows 98 support.
.NET Framework SDK Version 1.1	?	1.1.4322.573	2003-03-29		Included in Visual Studio 2003. Does not include the Platform SDK.
Microsoft Platform SDK for Windows XP SP2	?	5.1.2600.2180	2004-08		Introduced strsafe.h
Windows Server 2003 SP1 Platform SDK	v5.2	5.2.3790.1830.15	2005-05-02		
Windows Server 2003 R2 Platform SDK	v5.2	5.2.3790.2075.51	2006-03-14		Last Platform SDK to develop for Windows 2000. Also suggested by MS to work with VS6 with no guarantee as it has not been tested with specific requirements.
.NET Framework 2.0 Software Development Kit	?	2.0.50727.42	2006-11-29		Included in Visual Studio 2005 Professional. Does not include the Platform SDK.
Microsoft Windows Software Development Kit for Windows Vista and .NET Framework 3.0 Runtime Components	v6.0	6.0.6000.16384	2006-10-30		The C++ compilers in this SDK release support the /analyze key.
Microsoft Windows Software Development Kit Update for Windows Vista	v6.1	6.1.6000.16384.10	2007-03-22		First unified .NET and Platform SDK. Does not support Visual Studio .NET 2003 and Microsoft Visual C++ Toolkit 2003
(No standalone package)	v6.0a	6.1.6723.1	2007-11-19		Included in Visual Studio 2008
Windows SDK for Windows Server 2008 and .NET Framework 3.5	v6.1	6.0.6001.18000.367	2008-02-05		
Microsoft Windows SDK for Windows 7 and .NET Framework 3.5 SP1	v7.0	6.1.7600.16385	2009-07-24	,	
(No standalone package)	v7.0a	6.1.7600.16385	2010-04-12		Included in Visual Studio 2010 and encompasses .NET Framework 4 development. Does not work for Visual Studio 2010 Express. The last version to include offline documentation.
Microsoft Windows SDK for Windows 7 and .NET Framework 4	v7.1	7.1.7600.0.30514	2010-05-19	,	It is the latest version that officially supports Windows XP target. .NET Framework 4 needed. Higher sub-version from .NET Framework is not recognised by installation. Building the samples with nmake.exe is not supported, most of the NMAKE macros are removed.
(No standalone package)	v7.1A	7.1.51106	?	?	Included in Visual Studio 2012 Update 1 (or later). Introduces the "v110_xp" platform toolset.
Microsoft Windows SDK for Windows 8 and .NET Framework 4.5	v8.0	6.2.9200.16384	2012-11-15		Encompasses SDKs for .NET Framework 4.5, Windows Store apps, and DirectX,
(No standalone package)	v8.0A	8.0.50727	?	?	Included in Visual Studio 2012.
Windows Software Development Kit (SDK) for Windows 8.1	v8.1	8.100.25984.0	2013-10-17		Encompasses SDKs for Windows 8.1, .NET Framework 4.5.1, Windows Store apps and DirectX.
(No standalone package)	v8.1A	8.1.51636	?	?	Included in Visual Studio 2013. Includes the "v120_xp" platform toolset.
Windows Standalone SDK for Windows 10	v10	10.0.10240.0	2015-07-29		Also included in Visual Studio 2015
Windows Standalone SDK for Windows 10, Version 1511	v10	10.0.10586.212	2015-11-30		Also included in Visual Studio 2015 Update 1 & 2
Windows Standalone SDK for Windows 10, Version 1607	v10	10.0.14393.795	2016-08-02		Also included in Visual Studio 2015 Update 3
Windows Standalone SDK for Windows 10 Creators Update, Version 1703	v10	10.0.15063.0	2017-04-05		Included in Visual Studio 2017 ver.15.1
Windows 10 SDK for Fall Creators Update, version 1709	v10	10.0.16299.15	2017-10-10		Included in Visual Studio 2017 ver.15.4
Windows 10 SDK for April 2018 Update, version 1803	v10	10.0.17134.0	2018-05-08		Included in Visual Studio 2017 ver.15.7
Windows 10 SDK for October 2018 Update, version 1809	v10	10.0.17763.0	2018-10-02		Included in Visual Studio 2017 ver.15.8
Windows 10 SDK for Windows 10, version 1903	v10	10.0.18362.0	2019-05-21		Included in Visual Studio 2019
Windows 10 SDK for Windows 10, version 2004	v10	10.0.19041.0	2020-05-12		
Windows 10 SDK for Windows 10, version 2004	v10	10.0.19041.685	2020-12-16		Servicing update
Windows 10 SDK for Windows 10, version 21H1	v10	10.0.20348.0	2021-05-25		
Windows 10 SDK for Windows 11	v10	10.0.22000.194	2021-10-04		
Windows SDK for Windows 11	v10	10.0.22621.755	2022-10-25		Released as part of Windows 11, version 22H2. Includes servicing update 10.0.22000.755 on October 25, 2022, Includes ARM64 support for the Visual Studio 17.4 release
Windows SDK for Windows 11	v10	10.0.22621.1778	2023-05-24		Released as part of Windows 11, version 22H2 Build 10.0.22621.1778.
Windows SDK for Windows 11	v10	10.0.26100.0	2024-05-22		Initial release of the 10.0.26100 series, to correspond with the Windows 11, version 24H2 preview.
Windows SDK for Windows 11	v10	10.0.28000.0	2026-03-31		Initial release of the 10.0.28000 series.

Removed features
Version	Removed feature
Windows SDK for Windows 7 and .NET Framework 3.5 SP1	capicom.dll (CAPICOM is deprecated); iacom.dll; ialoader.dll; msistuff.exe; perflibmig.exe; permcalc.exe; secutil.exe; windowssideshowvirtualdevice.exe (replaced by DeviceSimulatorforWindowsSideShow.msi); wpfperf.msi (now included in the Windows Performance Toolkit suite); xamlpad.exe (XAMLPad)
Windows SDK for Windows 7 and .NET Framework 4	UISpy.exe (Replaced by newer tools); Wpt_arch.msi; Managed code samples (Moved to Code Gallery); DExplore document viewer (Can be separately installed)
Windows SDK for Windows 8	Command-line build environment, including: Windows SDK Platform Toolset; Visual C++ Compilers and C Runtime (CRT); Windows SDK Configuration Tool; Tools and reference assemblies for versions of the .NET Framework earlier than 4.5; Apatch.exe; Bind.exe; Checkv4.exe; Consume.exe; DeviceSimulatorForWindowsSideShow.msi; Err.exe; FDBrowser.exe; FXCopSetup.exe; Guidgen.exe; Make-Shell.exe; MDbg.exe; Mpatch.exe; MSIZap.exe; PTConform.exe; ReBase.exe; sddlgen.exe; setenv.cmd; SetReg.exe; SoapSuds.exe; Sporder.exe; TcpAnalyzer.exe; TSPDesigner.exe; UTL2IDL.exe; ValidateSD.exe; VirtualLightSensor.exe; WinDiff.exe; WpfPerf.exe; All Windows samples (moved to Code Gallery); Microsoft Help Viewer; IntelliSense XML documentation comments for the .NET Framework reference assemblies
Windows SDK for Windows 8.1	Nothing
Windows SDK for Windows 10	Nothing

== See also ==
- Microsoft Learn
- Windows Driver Kit
- Windows App SDK
