= XSP =

XSP may refer to:

- XSP (software), an ASP.NET server
- eXtensible Server Pages, a language in Apache Cocoon
- The IATA airport code of Seletar Airport, Singapore
- Experimental Spaceplane (XSP) project previously known as XS-1
