= MonoCross =

MonoCross is a C# .NET Model-view-controller (MVC) framework where the Model and Controller are shared across platforms and the View is implemented for every specific platform and/or target architecture. It allows the development of both native and HTML5 web apps that share business logic and data code. The pattern enables cross-platform portability of business logic and data access code, (Model + Controller), while supporting full, native and/or platform-specific presentation (Views). This enables separation of the presentation layer, (View) from the application code (Model + Controller). This modification enables portability of application code across multiple platform targets.

It uses MonoTouch to produce native iOS applications for iPhone, iPad, and iPod Touch, Mono for Android to creating native Android applications, and ASP.NET to support HTML5 apps using AJAX, CSS, and JavaScript.

The framework is mentioned in books, and is being used by large Fortune 500 enterprises in production.
