= XSP (software) =

- Original author: Ximian
- Developers: .NET Foundation and Xamarin (a Microsoft subsidiary)
- Stable release: 4.7.1 / January 21, 2020; 5 years ago
- Repository: github.com/mono/xsp
- Written in: C#
- Operating system: Linux
- Platform: .NET Framework, Mono
- Type: Web server that hosts ASP.NET's system
- License: Microsoft Public License
- Website: mono-project.com/ASP.NET

XSP is a simple, standalone web server written in C# that hosts ASP.NET's System for Linux and other Unix operating systems. It runs on the Mono runtime for Linux and the .NET Framework runtime, making it usable as a lightweight web server on any platform supporting .NET.

XSP was the original name of the internal project at Microsoft that became ASP.NET. The name pays homage to the original name of what became ASP.NET.

XSP is commonly used as a lightweight host for ASP.NET applications during development and testing, providing a minimal web server environment that supports the System.Web facilities of the Mono runtime. It is often employed in situations where a full production‑grade server is not required, such as experimenting with ASP.NET features or running simple web applications in cross‑platform environments.

== See also ==
- mod_mono
