= Moonlight (runtime) =

Implementation of Microsoft Silverlight for Unix-based operating systems

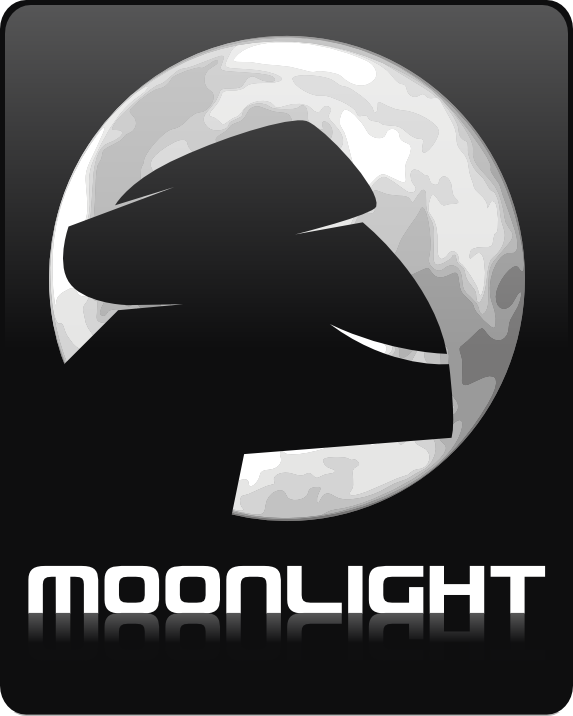
- Original author: Novell
- Developer: Xamarin
- Release: March 4, 2009; 17 years ago
- Stable release: 3.99.0.3 / 27 April 2011
- Preview release: 4.0 Preview 1 / 15 February 2011
- Written in: C, C++, C#
- Operating system: Linux
- Type: Web Application framework
- License: LGPL 2 with proprietary codecs
- Website: mono-project.com/moonlight
- Repository: github.com/mono/moon

Moonlight is a discontinued free and open source implementation for Linux and other Unix-based operating systems of the Microsoft Silverlight application framework, developed and then abandoned by the Mono Project. Like Silverlight, Moonlight was a web application framework which provided capabilities similar to those of Adobe Flash, integrating multimedia, graphics, animations and interactivity into a single runtime environment.

== History and overview ==
Release History
Date	Version
2009-02-11	Moonlight 1.0
2009-12-17	Moonlight 2.0
2010-02-03	Moonlight 3.0 Preview 1
2011-02-15	Moonlight 4 Preview 1

In an interview in the beginning of June 2007, Miguel de Icaza said the Mono team expected to offer a "feasibility 'alpha' demo" in mid-June 2007, with support for Mozilla Firefox on Linux by the end of the year.

After a 21-day hacking spree by the Mono team (including Chris Toshok, Larry Ewing and Jeffrey Stedfast among others), a public demo was shown at Microsoft ReMIX conference in Paris, France on June 21, 2007.

However, in September 2007, developers still needed to install and compile a lot of Mono and Olive (the experimental Mono subproject for .NET 3.0 support) modules from the Mono SVN repository to be able to test Moonlight. A Moonlight IDE, named Lunar Eclipse, exists in SVN for XAML designs. Moonlight uses Cairo for rendering.

Moonlight was provided as a plugin for Firefox and Chrome on popular Linux distributions. The plugin itself does not include a media codec pack, but when the Moonlight plugin detects playable media it refers users to download a free Media codec pack from Microsoft.

Moonlight 2.0 tracked the Silverlight 2.0 implementation. The first completed version, Moonlight 1.0, supporting Silverlight 1.0, was released in January 2009. Moonlight 2.0 was released in December 2009. The Moonlight 2.0 release also contained some features of Silverlight 3 including a pluggable media framework which allowed Moonlight to work with pluggable open codecs, such as Theora and Dirac.

Preview releases of Moonlight 4.0, targeting Silverlight 4 compatibility, were released in early 2011.

In April 2011, the Moonlight team demonstrated Moonlight running on Android tablets and phones at the MIX11 Web Developers conference in Las Vegas.

Shortly after the April 2011 release, The Attachmate Group, parent to developer Mono, laid off an undisclosed number of Mono employees, and announced a deal with startup Xamarin for Mono development and support. At that time, Xamarin CEO Nat Friedman affirmed their commitment to the Moonlight project, although there were no outward signs of any further development afterward.

In December 2011, de Icaza announced that work on Moonlight had stopped with no future plans. He explained that Microsoft had "cut the air supply" to it by omitting cross-platform components, making it a web-only plugin, and including Windows-only features. He advised developers to separate user interface code from the rest of their application development to ensure "a great UI experience on every platform (Mac, Linux, Android, iOS, Windows and Web)" without being dependent on third party APIs.

== DRM ==
Silverlight supports digital rights management in its multimedia stack, but Microsoft will not license their PlayReady DRM software for the Moonlight project to use and so Moonlight is unable to play encrypted content.

== Desktop support ==
Moonlight was also usable outside of the browser as a Gtk+ widget (known as Moonlight.Gtk). A number of Desklets were written using this new technology during the Novell Hack Week in 2007.

MoonBase is an experimental set of helper classes built on top of Moonlight.Gtk that can be used to create full blown C# desktop applications using the Moonlight (Silverlight 4.0) widgets and XAML files. MoonBase also has a related XAML editor/previewer.

== Microsoft support ==
Shortly after the first demo at MIX 07 in Paris, Microsoft began cooperating with Novell to help with the building of Moonlight. Support included giving exclusive access to Novell for the following Silverlight artifacts:

- Microsoft's Test suites for Silverlight,
- Silverlight specification details, beyond those available on the web,
- Proprietary codecs made available free-of-charge for Windows Media Video and Audio, for VC-1 and MP3, and in the future H.264 and AAC, only licensed for use with Moonlight when running in a web browser. Other potential decoders include GStreamer and FFmpeg (used during the development stage) but Novell will not provide prepackaged versions of Moonlight with those libraries, because those decoders have not been granted licensing for the use of patented codec technologies.

Microsoft released two public covenants not to sue for the infringement of its patents when using Moonlight. The first one covered Moonlight 1 and 2, is quite restrictive and covered only the use of Moonlight as a plugin in a browser, only implementations that are not GPLv3 licensed, and only if the Moonlight implementation has been obtained from Novell. It also notes that Microsoft may rescind these usage rights.

The second covenant was an updated and broader covenant that no longer limits the covenant to users that obtain Moonlight from Novell, it covers any uses of Moonlight regardless of where it was obtained. The updated covenant covers the implementations as shipped by Novell for versions 3 and 4, it no longer distinguishes Novell from other distributions of Moonlight and expands the covenant to desktop applications created with Moonlight. The covenant does not extend to forks licensed under the GNU GPL (Moonlight itself uses the Lesser GPLv2).

== Codecs integration ==
Although Moonlight is free software, the final version was going to use binary-only audio and video codecs provided by Microsoft which will be licensed for use with Moonlight only when used as a browser plugin (see above). The Windows media pack is not distributed together with the Moonlight plugin but the first time when media content in Silverlight is detected the user will be prompted to download the pack containing the codecs used in Silverlight directly from Microsoft.

Self built versions could still use the FFmpeg library and there was discussion about adding GStreamer support as an alternative to using Microsoft's binary codecs for those who wish to use GStreamer instead and also for use when used outside of a browser.

Mono architect Miguel de Icaza blogged that the Mono team prototyped Moonlight multimedia support using the LGPL-licensed FFmpeg engine but that they were unable to redistribute packaged versions that used that library due to FFmpeg codec licensing issues inside of the United States.

== Moonlight in other distributions ==
After the release of Moonlight 2, a covenant provided by Microsoft was updated to ensure that other third party distributors can distribute Moonlight without their users having to worry about getting sued over patent infringement by Microsoft. This covenant can be found on the Microsoft website.

Kevin Kofler and Tom Callaway, of Fedora, have stated publicly that the last covenant was "not acceptable" for that distribution and that "it is still not permissible in Fedora".

The version of Moonlight that was going to be available direct from Novell would have access to licensed closed source media codecs provided free of charge by Microsoft. Third-party distributions of Moonlight would only be able to play non-patent encumbered media like Vorbis, Theora and Ogg. To support other formats, the distributors would have had to choose from a few licensing options:

- Negotiate licences directly with individual media codec owners (e.g. MPEG-LA, Fraunhofer Society)
- Negotiate access to Microsoft's Media Pack as Novell have done
- Use GStreamer or a commercial codec license
- Use a hardware-specific software like VDPAU

At the PDC conference on October 13, 2008, Microsoft placed the 'Silverlight XAML Vocabulary' under the Microsoft Open Specification Promise, stating in a press release, "The Silverlight XAML vocabulary specification, released under the Microsoft Open Specification Promise, will better enable third-party ISVs to create products that can read and write XAML for Silverlight." Since Moonlight is essentially a XAML reader, Debian's position is that Moonlight is safe for them to redistribute (leaving each user to agree to their own licensing for Microsoft's and others' binary codecs).

== See also ==
- MonoDevelop – an open source IDE targeting both Mono and Microsoft .NET Framework platforms
