= ASP.NET Dynamic Data =

Web programming framework

- Original author: Microsoft
- Initial release: 2002; 23 years ago
- Operating system: Microsoft Windows, Linux, macOS
- Type: Web application scaffolding framework
- Website: ASP.NET Dynamic Data Overview

ASP.NET Dynamic Data is a Ruby on Rails-inspired web application scaffolding framework from Microsoft, shipped as an extension to ASP.NET, that can be used to build data-driven web applications. It exposes tables in a database by encoding it in the URI of the ASP.NET web service, and the data in the table is automatically rendered to HTML. The process of rendering can be controlled using custom design templates. Internally, it discovers the database schema by using the database metadata.

ASP.NET Dynamic Data was originally shipped as part of the "ASP.NET 3.5 Extensions" package in 2007, and was incorporated into the .NET Framework 3.5 Service Pack 1, which was released August 11, 2008.

ASP.NET Dynamic Data provides scaffolding and UI generation capabilities, automatically creating pages for common data operations (such as listing, editing, and inserting records) based on the registered data model. It also offers built‑in support for data validation and customization using field and page templates, allowing developers to tailor the appearance and behavior of the generated UI with minimal additional code.
