= EXtensible Server Pages =

Write your short description here

eXtensible Server Pages (XSP) is an XML-based language, which offers the possibility of dynamically arranged Java code into XML documents.

It was developed by the Apache Software Foundation for the Web Publishing Framework Cocoon. The focus of XSP is the separation of content, logic and presentation. The Java program code is in its own XML section <xsp:logic> that can either occur within or outside of the root element (<xsp:page>).

The Java code is compiled with the first call. These directives are replaced by the generated content so that the resulting, augmented XML document can be subject to further processing with XSL Transformations.

XSP pages are transformed into Cocoon producers, typically as Java classes, though any scripting language for which a Java-based processor exists could also be used.

Directives can be either XSP built-in processing tags or user-defined library tags. XSP built-in tags are used to embed procedural logic, substitute expressions and dynamically build XML nodes. User-defined library tags act as templates that dictate how program code is generated from information encoded in each dynamic tag.
