= Scaffold (programming) =

Code generation technique or a project generation technique

Scaffolding, as used in computing, refers to one of two techniques:

Code generation
It is a technique related to database access in some model–view–controller frameworks.
Project generation
It is a technique supported by various programming tools.

== Code generation ==
Scaffolding in software development refers to automated code generation techniques that quickly produce the fundamental structure of software applications. Typically employed within model–view–controller (MVC) and similar architectural patterns, scaffolding helps developers rapidly create code for common application functions and data interactions, particularly CRUD operations.

Scaffolding evolved from earlier software development tools such as Oracle's CASE Generator and various other 4GL tools, designed to simplify the creation of robust database-driven applications.

=== Applications and frameworks ===
The concept gained widespread popularity through frameworks like Ruby on Rails, known for its efficient generation of MVC structures and CRUD operations. Scaffolding is now supported by a wide range of development frameworks across different programming languages, including:

Ruby on Rails
Popularized scaffolding for MVC structures.
Django
Offers built-in admin interface and model-based scaffolding.
Express Framework (JavaScript)
Scaffolding for rapid REST API development.
Play Framework (Java/Scala)
Facilitates quick project setup and MVC scaffolding.
Laravel (PHP)
Uses Artisan CLI for generating MVC components.
Symfony (PHP)
Provides flexible scaffolding options via maker bundles.
CakePHP (PHP)
Offers extensive scaffolding capabilities for MVC.
ASP.NET MVC (.NET)
Includes built-in scaffolding tools for controllers and views.
Spring Roo (Java)
Rapid development through extensive scaffolding.
Grails (Groovy)
Dynamic scaffolding and rapid prototyping.
Angular (JavaScript)
Utilizes Angular CLI for scaffolding components and services.
React.js (JavaScript)
Supports scaffolding through tools like Create React App.

=== Run-time vs. design-time scaffolding ===
Scaffolding can occur at two distinct phases of software development:

Design-time scaffolding
This occurs during the development phase, generating files and code structures that can be customized and maintained by the developer. Although highly customizable, extensive scaffolding at design-time may introduce complexity due to a large number of generated files, which developers need to manage and maintain manually.
Run-time scaffolding
This method dynamically generates and handles operations at run-time, minimizing manual file generation. Run-time scaffolding simplifies management but offers fewer customization options and may impact application performance.

=== Benefits and limitations ===
Scaffolding presents several advantages and disadvantages:

==== Benefits ====
- Accelerates development cycles.
- Standardizes coding practices and promotes consistency.
- Enhances rapid prototyping and iterative development.

==== Limitations ====
- Generated code may require extensive customization.
- Can introduce unnecessary complexity for smaller or simpler applications.
- May reduce developers' understanding of underlying code structures.

== Project generation ==
Complicated software projects often share certain conventions on project structure and requirements. For example, they often have separate folders for source code, binaries and code tests, as well as files containing license agreements, release notes and contact information. To simplify the creation of projects following those conventions, "scaffolding" tools can automatically generate them at the beginning of each project. Such tools include Yeoman, Cargo and Ritchie CLI. For .NET projects, dotnet, the command-line tool included with the .NET SDK, can be used to scaffold new projects.

== See also ==
- Spring Roo – Open-source software tool
- Play Framework – Open-source web framework written in Scala
- Apache Tapestry – Open-source web application framework
- Symfony – PHP web application framework for MVC applications
- Laravel – PHP open-source web application framework
- Phalcon PHP – PHP open-source web framework
- Catalyst – Open-source web application framework
- Mojolicious – Internet application framework
- ASP.NET Dynamic Data – Web programming framework
- Ruby on Rails – Server-side open source web application framework
- Yii – Web application framework
- CodeIgniter – Free and open-source software web development framework
- CakePHP – Open-source web framework in PHP
- MonoRail – Open source web application framework
- FuelPHP – Open-source web application framework
- Django (web framework) – Python web framework
- OutSystems Platform (PaaS) – Software company
- Yeoman
