= Mod mono =

Apache module

mod_mono
- Developer: Xamarin / Microsoft
- Stable release: 3.13 / 6 April 2018; 8 years ago
- Written in: C
- Platform: Mono
- Type: Module for the Apache HTTP Server
- License: Apache License 2.0
- Website: www.mono-project.com/Mod_mono
- Repository: github.com/mono/mod_mono

mod_mono is a module for the Apache HTTP Server that allows for hosting of ASP.NET pages and other assemblies on multiple platforms by use of the Mono development platform.

A similar module called mod_aspdotnet by another group allows hosting of ASP.NET pages and other assemblies with the Microsoft .NET Framework but because of that dependency, will only function on Microsoft Windows platforms.

The source code is written in the C programming language. It is licensed under Apache License 2.0 and hosted on GitHub.

In typical deployments, mod_mono works together with the mod‑mono‑server backend, which actually hosts the ASP.NET runtime and executes the application logic. mod_mono forwards incoming HTTP requests to mod‑mono‑server via a socket, allowing Apache to serve multiple independent ASP.NET applications within isolated application domains on the same server.

== See also ==
- List of Apache modules
