= C Sharp 2.0 =

Version of the C# programming language

The computer programming language, C#, introduces several new features in version 2.0 (corresponding to the 3rd edition of the ECMA-334 standard and the .NET Framework 2.0). These include:

== C# 2.0 Features ==
=== Partial class ===
Partial classes allow implementation of a class to be spread between several files, with each file containing one or more class members. It is useful primarily when parts of a class are generated automatically. For example, the feature is heavily used by code-generating user interface designers in Visual Studio.

file1.cs:

public partial class MyClass
{
    public void MyMethod1()
    {
        // Manually written code
    }
}

file2.cs:

public partial class MyClass
{
    public void MyMethod2()
    {
        // Automatically generated code
    }
}

=== Generics ===
Generics, or parameterized types, or parametric polymorphism is a .NET 2.0 feature supported by C# and Visual Basic. Unlike C++ templates, .NET parameterized types are instantiated at runtime rather than by the compiler; hence they can be cross-language whereas C++ templates cannot. They support some features not supported directly by C++ templates such as type constraints on generic parameters by use of interfaces. On the other hand, C# does not support non-type generic parameters. Unlike generics in Java, .NET generics use reification to make parameterized types first-class objects in the CLI Virtual Machine, which allows for optimizations and preservation of the type information.

=== Static classes ===
Static classes are classes that cannot be instantiated or inherited from, and that only allow static members. Their purpose is similar to that of modules in many procedural languages.

=== Generator functionality ===
The .NET 2.0 Framework allowed C# to introduce an iterator that provides generator functionality, using a yield return construct similar to yield in Python. With a yield return, the function automatically keeps its state during the iteration.

using System.Collections.Generic;

// Method that takes an iterable input (possibly an array)
// and returns all even numbers.
public static IEnumerable<int> GetEven(IEnumerable<int> numbers)
{
    foreach (int i in numbers)
    {
        if (i % 2 == 0) 
        {
            yield return i;
        }
    }
}

There is also a yield break statement, in which control is unconditionally returned to the caller of the iterator. There is an implicit yield break at the end of each generator method.

=== Anonymous delegates ===
As a precursor to the lambda functions introduced in C# 3.0, C#2.0 added anonymous delegates. These provide closure-like functionality to C#. Code inside the body of an anonymous delegate has full read/write access to local variables, method parameters, and class members in scope of the delegate, excepting out and ref parameters. For example:-

using System;

int SumOfArrayElements(int[] array)
{
    int sum = 0;
    Array.ForEach(array, delegate(int x) { sum += x; });
    return sum;
}

Unlike some closure implementations, each anonymous delegate instance has access to the same relative memory location for each bound variable, rather than to the actual values at each creation. See a fuller discussion of this distinction.

=== Delegate covariance and contravariance ===
Conversions from method groups to delegate types are covariant and contravariant in return and parameter types, respectively.

=== The accessibility of property accessors can be set independently ===
Example:

using System;

string status = String.Empty;

public string Status
{
    get { return status; }             // anyone can get value of this property,
    protected set { status = value; }  // but only derived classes can change it
}

=== Nullable value types ===
Nullable value types (denoted by a question mark, e.g. int? i = null;) which add null to the set of allowed values for any value type. This provides improved interaction with SQL databases, which can have nullable columns of types corresponding to C# primitive types: an SQL INTEGER NULL column type directly translates to the C# int?.

Nullable value types received an improvement at the end of August 2005, shortly before the official launch, to improve their boxing characteristics: a nullable variable which is assigned null is not actually a null reference, but rather an instance of System.Nullable<T> with property HasValue equal to false. When boxed, the System.Nullable<T> instance itself is boxed, and not the value stored in it, so the resulting reference would always be non-null, even for null values. The following code illustrates the corrected flaw:

using System;

int? i = null;
object o = i;
if (o == null)
{
    Console.WriteLine("Correct behaviour - runtime version from September 2005 or later");
}
else
{
    Console.WriteLine("Incorrect behaviour - pre-release runtime (from before September 2005)");
}

When copied into objects, the official release boxes values from System.Nullable instances, so null values and null references are considered equal. The late nature of this fix caused some controversy , since it required core-CLR changes affecting not only .NET2, but all dependent technologies (including C#, VB, SQL Server 2005 and Visual Studio 2005).

=== Null-coalescing operator ===
The ?? operator is called the null coalescing operator and is used to define a default value for nullable value types as well as reference types. It returns the left-hand operand if it is not null; otherwise it returns the right operand.

using System;

object nullObj = null; 
object obj = new Object(); 
return nullObj ?? obj; // returns obj

The primary use of this operator is to assign a nullable type to a non-nullable type with an easy syntax:

int? i = null;
int j = i ?? 0; // If i is not null, initialize j to i. Else (if i is null), initialize j to 0.

== See also ==
- C# 3.0
- C# 4.0
