= C Sharp 4.0 =

Version of the C# programming language

C# 4.0 is a version of the C# programming language that was released on April 11, 2010. Microsoft released the 4.0 runtime and development environment Visual Studio 2010. The major focus of C# 4.0 is interoperability with partially or fully dynamically typed languages and frameworks, such as the Dynamic Language Runtime and COM.

== Features ==
The following new features were added in C# 4.0.

=== Dynamic member lookup ===
A new pseudo-type dynamic is introduced into the C# type system. It is treated as System.Object, but in addition, any member access (method call, field, property, or indexer access, or a delegate invocation) or application of an operator on a value of such type is permitted without any type checking, and its resolution is postponed until run-time. This is known as duck typing. For example:

// Returns the value of Length property or field of any object
int GetLength(dynamic obj)
{
    return obj.Length;
}
  
GetLength("Hello, world");        // a string has a Length property,
GetLength(new int[] { 1, 2, 3 }); // and so does an array,
GetLength(42);                    // but not an integer - an exception will be thrown in GetLength method at run-time

Dynamic method calls are triggered by a value of type dynamic as any implicit or explicit parameter (and not just a receiver). For example:

using System;

void Print(dynamic obj)
{
    Console.WriteLine(obj); // which overload of WriteLine() to call is decided at run-time
}

Print(123);   // ends up calling WriteLine(int)
Print("abc"); // ends up calling WriteLine(string)

Dynamic lookup is performed using three distinct mechanisms: COM IDispatch for COM objects, IDynamicMetaObjectProvider DLR interface for objects implementing that interface, and reflection for all other objects. Any C# class can therefore intercept dynamic calls on its instances by implementing IDynamicMetaObjectProvider.

In case of dynamic method and indexer calls, overload resolution happens at run-time according to the actual types of the values passed as arguments, but otherwise according to the usual C# overloading resolution rules. Furthermore, in cases where the receiver in a dynamic call is not itself dynamic, run-time overload resolution will only consider the methods that are exposed on the declared compile-time type of the receiver. For example:

class Base
{
    void Foo(double x);
}

class Derived : Base
{
    void Foo(int x);
}

dynamic x = 123;
Base b = new Derived();
b.Foo(x); // picks Base.Foo(double) because b is of type Base, and Derived.Foo(int) is not exposed
dynamic b1 = b;
b1.Foo(x); // picks Derived.Foo(int)

Any value returned from a dynamic member access is itself of type dynamic. Values of type dynamic are implicitly convertible both from and to any other type. In the code sample above this permits GetLength function to treat the value returned by a call to Length as an integer without any explicit cast. At run time the actual value will be converted to the requested type.

=== Covariant and contravariant generic type parameters ===
Generic interfaces and delegates can have their type parameters marked as covariant or contravariant using keywords out and in respectively. These declarations are then respected for type conversions, both implicit and explicit, and both compile time and run time. For example, the existing interface System.Collections.Generic.IEnumerable<T> has been redefined as follows:

interface IEnumerable<out T>
{
    IEnumerator<T> GetEnumerator();
}

Therefore, any class that implements IEnumerable<Derived> for some class Derived is also considered to be compatible with IEnumerable<Base> for all classes and interfaces Base that Derived extends, directly or indirectly. In practice, it makes it possible to write code such as:

using System;
using System.Collections.Generic;

void PrintAll(IEnumerable<object> objects)
{
    foreach (object o in objects)
    {
        Console.WriteLine(o);
    }
}

IEnumerable<string> strings = new List<string>();
PrintAll(strings); // IEnumerable<string> is implicitly converted to IEnumerable<object>

For contravariance, the existing interface System.Collections.Generic.IComparer<T> has been redefined as follows:

public interface IComparer<in T>
{
    int Compare(T x, T y);
}

Therefore, any class that implements IComparer<Base> for some class Base is also considered to be compatible with IComparer<Derived> for all classes and interfaces Derived that are extended from Base. It makes it possible to write code such as:

using System.Collections.Generic;

IComparer<object> objectComparer = GetComparer();
IComparer<string> stringComparer = objectComparer;

=== Optional ref keyword when using COM ===
The ref keyword for callers of methods is now optional when calling into methods supplied by COM interfaces. Given a COM method with the signature

void Increment(ref int x);

the invocation can now be written as either

Increment(0); // no need for "ref" or a place holder variable any more

or

int x = 0;
Increment(ref x);

=== Optional parameters and named arguments ===
C# 4.0 introduces optional parameters with default values as seen in Visual Basic and C++. For example:

void Increment(ref int x, int dx = 1)
{
    x += dx;
}

int x = 0;
Increment(ref x);    // dx takes the default value of 1, after the method returns x == 1
Increment(ref x, 2); // dx takes the value 2, after the method returns x == 3

In addition, to complement optional parameters, it is possible explicitly to specify parameter names in method calls, allowing the programmer selectively to pass any subset of optional parameters for a method. The only restriction is that named parameters must be placed after the unnamed parameters. Parameter names can be specified for both optional and required parameters, and can be used to improve readability or arbitrarily to reorder arguments in a call. For example:

using System.IO;

Stream OpenFile(string name, FileMode mode = FileMode.Open, FileAccess access = FileAccess.Read) { ... }

OpenFile("file.txt"); // use default values for both "mode" and "access" 
OpenFile("file.txt", mode: FileMode.Create); // use default value for "access"
OpenFile("file.txt", access: FileAccess.Read); // use default value for "mode"
OpenFile(name: "file.txt", access: FileAccess.Read, mode: FileMode.Create); // name all parameters for extra readability, 
                                                                            // and use order different from method declaration

Optional parameters make interoperating with COM easier. Previously, C# had to pass in every parameter in the method of the COM component, even those that are optional. For example:

using System.Reflection;

object fileName = "Test.docx";
object missing = Missing.Value;

doc.SaveAs(ref fileName,
    ref missing, ref missing, ref missing,
    ref missing, ref missing, ref missing,
    ref missing, ref missing, ref missing,
    ref missing, ref missing, ref missing,
    ref missing, ref missing, ref missing);

With support for optional parameters, the code can be shortened as

doc.SaveAs(ref fileName);

Which, due to the now optional ref keyword when using COM, can further be shortened as

doc.SaveAs(fileName);

=== Indexed properties ===
Indexed properties (and default properties) of COM objects are now recognized, but C# objects still do not support them.

== See also ==
- C# 2.0
- C# 3.0
